= S-400 missile system =

Mobile surface-to-air missile air defense

S-400 Triumf NATO reporting name: SA-21 Growler
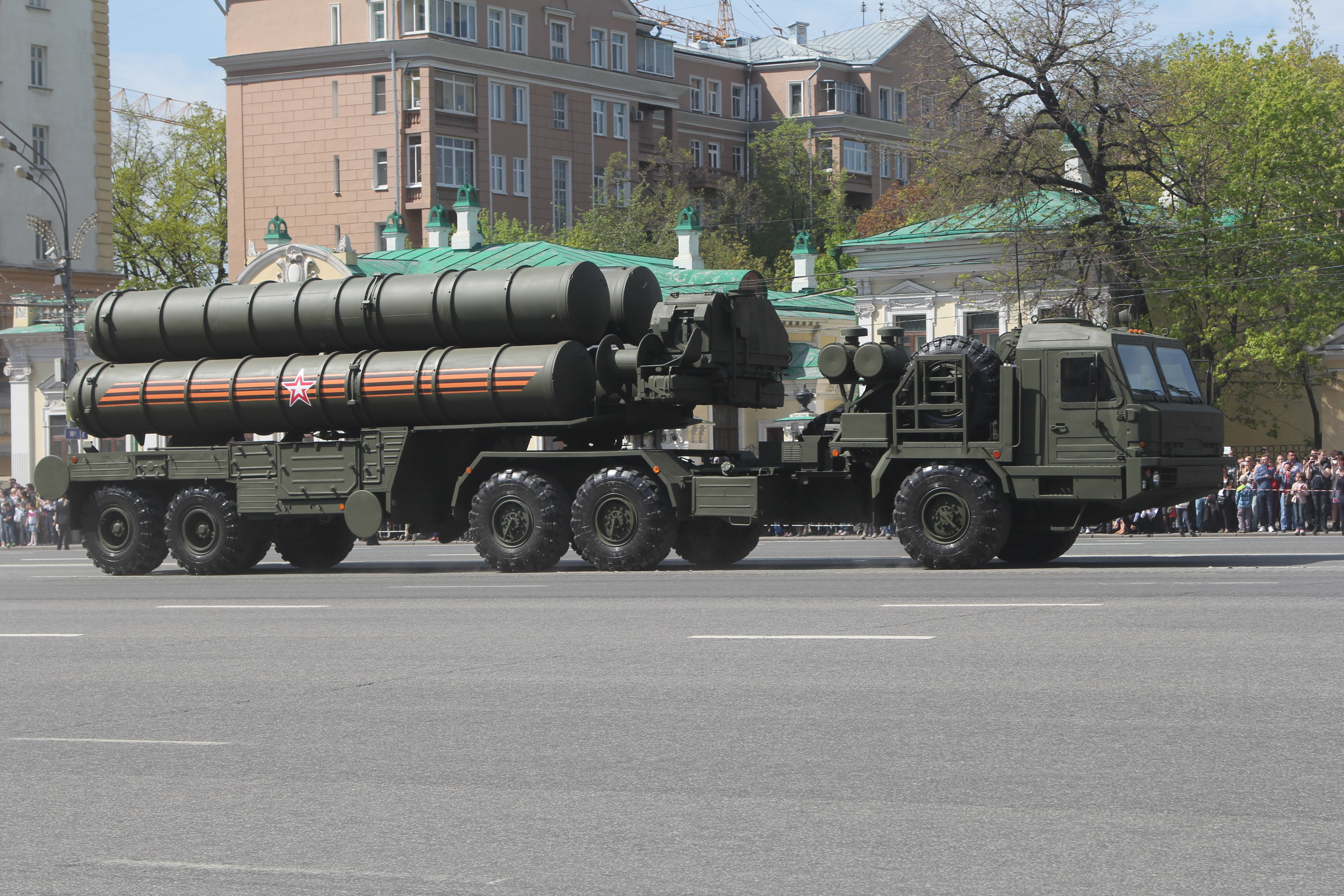
- S-400 Triumf launch vehicle
- Type: Mobile long-range surface-to-air/anti-ballistic missile system
- Place of origin: Russia

Service history
- In service: 6 August 2007 – present
- Used by: Primary user: Russia; See Operators section for others
- Wars: Syrian Civil War; Russo-Ukrainian war; 2025 India–Pakistan conflict

Production history
- Designer: Almaz-Antey
- Manufacturer: Fakel Machine-Building Design Bureau
- Unit cost: Domestic: ~US$500 million for a battery and reserve missiles. Export: US$1–1.25 billion for a battery and reserve missiles (2021)

Specifications
- Engine: YaMZ-8424.10 diesel V12; 400 hp (300 kW)
- Transmission: YaMZ
- Suspension: Leaf spring
- Ground clearance: 485 mm (19.1 in)
- Operational range: 400 km (250 mi) – 40N6E missile; 150 km (93 mi) – 48N6(E) missile; 200 km (120 mi) – 48N6M(E2) missile; 240 km (150 mi) – 48N6DM(E3) missile; 40 km (25 mi) – 9M96 missile; 120 km (75 mi) – 9M96M(E2) missile
- Guidance system: SARH with all missile model, and ARH in 40N6E, 9M96E2, 9M96E and 9M96 missiles

The S-400 Triumf (Russian: C-400 Триумф – Triumf; translation: Triumph; NATO reporting name: SA-21 Growler), previously known as the S-300 PMU-3, is a mobile surface-to-air missile (SAM) system developed in the 1990s by Russia's NPO Almaz as an upgrade to the S-300 family of missiles. The S-400 was approved for service on 28 April 2007 and the first battalion of the systems assumed combat duty on 6 August 2007. Its longest-ranged interceptor missile, the 40N6, has a purported range of 400 km. The S-400 can be integrated with the shorter-ranged Pantsir missile system, and potentially airborne radars such as of the Beriev A-50U and Sukhoi Su-35S.

The S-400 has been deployed by Russia, including in Belarus and Syria, by China since 2018, by Turkey since 2019, and by India since 2021. The S-400 was deployed during Russian intervention in the Syrian civil war from 2015 until the fall of the Assad regime in 2024. China's People's Liberation Army Air Force purchased S-400 systems in 2014, receiving six batteries beginning in 2018, where its range has the potential to affect the Cross-Strait conflict and the Senkaku Islands dispute. The delivery of S-400s to Turkey, which cited US refusal to sell the upgraded MIM-104 Patriot system, trigged Turkey's expulsion from the F-35 fighter aircraft program. Russia has also deployed its own S-400s to Belarus, including from late 2021.

The first alleged S-400 shootdown occurred on 25 February 2022, the second day of the Russo-Ukrainian war, when a system based in Belarus downed a Ukrainian Air Force Sukhoi Su-27 near Kyiv. In November 2025, Russian officials claimed the first shootdowns of Ukraine-launched ATACMS tactical ballistic missiles with the system. India, which purchased systems in 2015 and began receiving squadrons in 2021, claimed to have successfully used it in the May 2025 India–Pakistan conflict. The system is complemented by its successor, the S-500, with a purported range of 600 km, which began service with Russia in 2021.

== Development ==
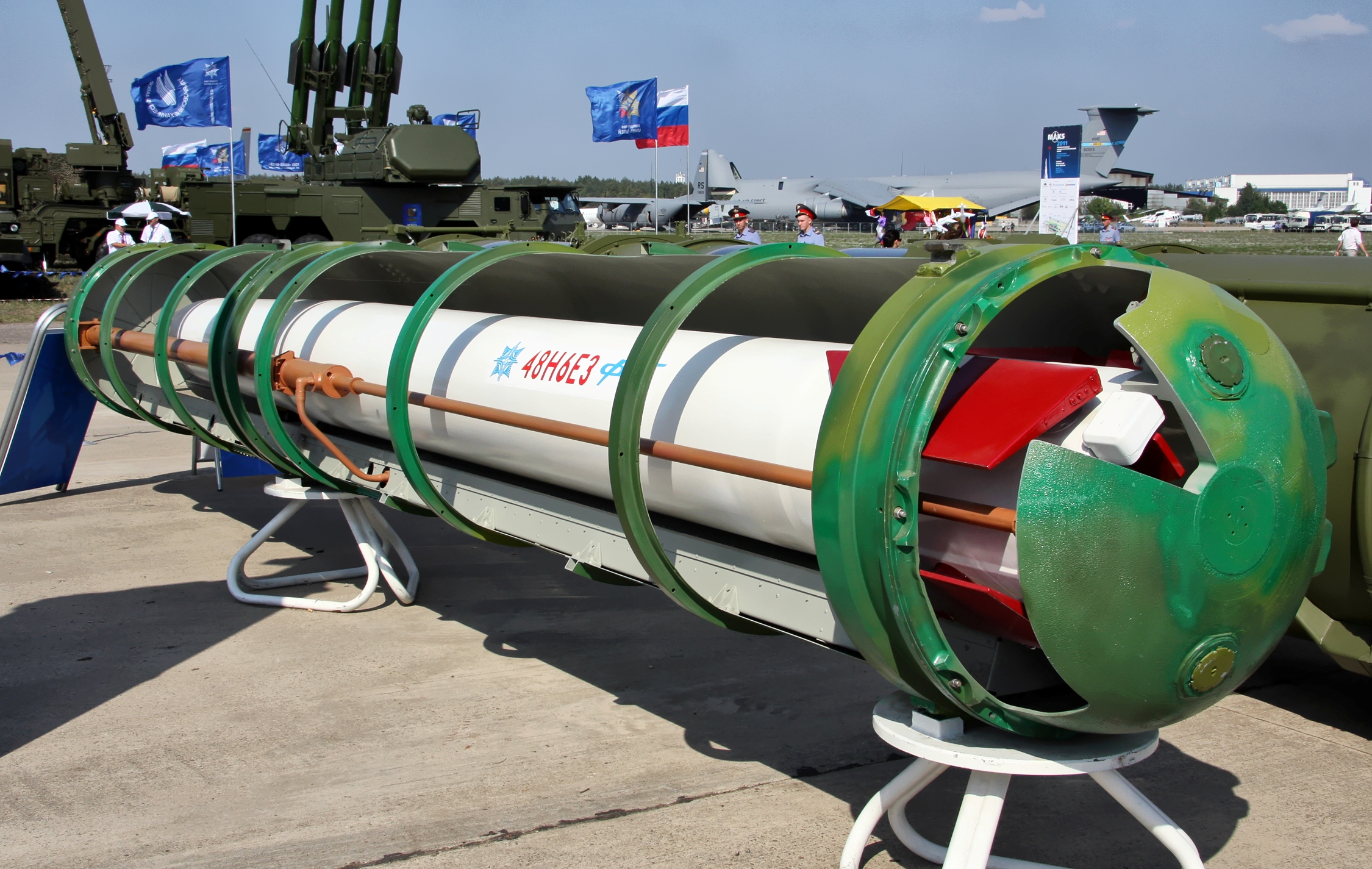
The 48N6E3 missile used by the S-400

The development of the S-400 began in the early 1980s to replace the S-200 missile system, but was rejected by a state commission due to high cost and inability to address the threat of cruise missiles. In the late 1980s, the programme was revived in under the codename Triumf as a system capable of engaging aircraft at long range plus cruise missiles and stealth aircraft. The Soviet government approved the Truimf programme on 22 August 1991, but the collapse of the Soviet Union put development into limbo. It was announced by the Russian Air Force in January 1993. On 12 February 1999 successful tests were reported at Kapustin Yar in Astrakhan, and the S-400 was scheduled for deployment by the Russian army in 2001. The S-400 was officially revived on 7 July 1999, albeit as a modernization of the S-300PM rather than an S-200 replacement. Alexander Lemanskiy of Almaz-Antey was the Chief Engineer on the S-400 project.

In 2003, it became apparent that the system was not ready for deployment. In August, two high-ranking military officials expressed concern that the S-400 was being tested with older interceptors from the S-300P system and concluded that it was not ready for deployment. The completion of the project was announced in February 2004. In April, a ballistic missile was successfully intercepted in a test of the upgraded 48N6DM missile. The system was approved for service by the government on 28 April 2007. Russia had accepted for service the 40N6 long-range missile for the S-400 air-defence system, a source in the domestic defence industry told TASS news agency in October 2018.

The S-400 Triumf and Pantsir missile system can be integrated into a two-layer defence system.

== Structure ==
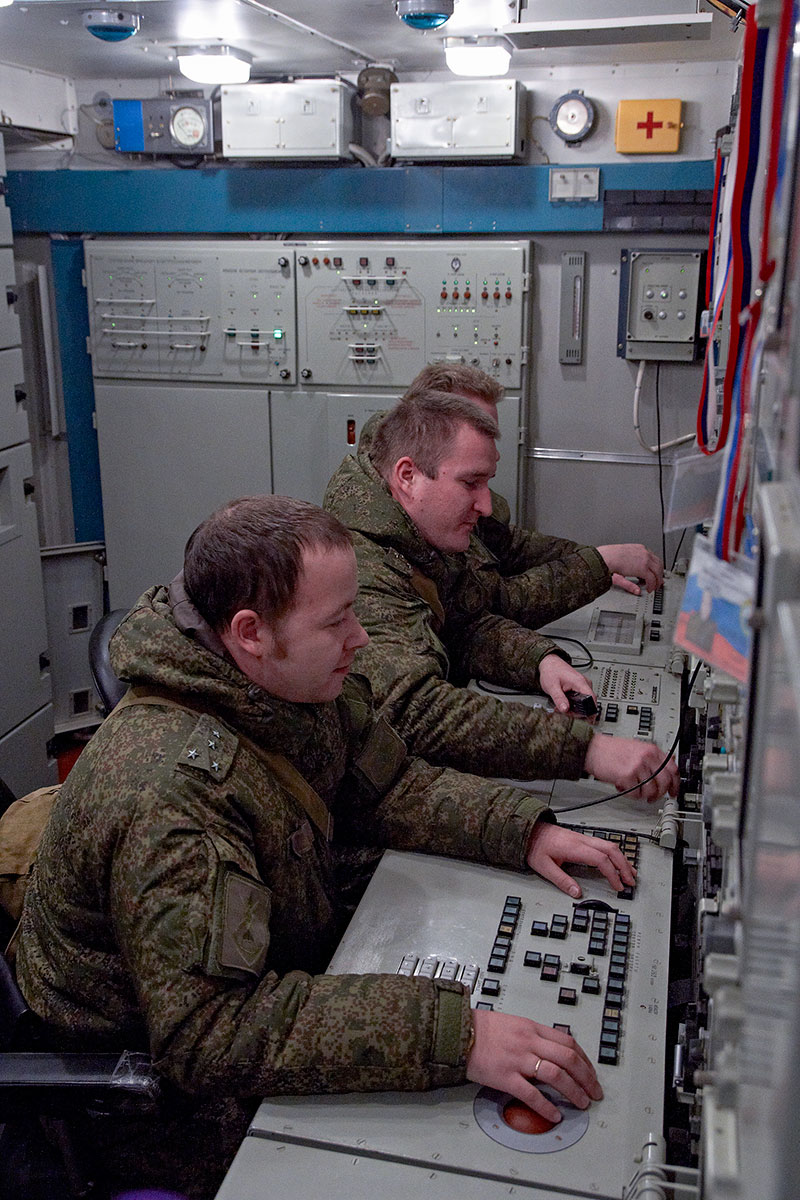
PBU 55K6E command centre

S-400 missile systems are organized around the 30K6E administration system, which can coordinate eight divizions (battalions). The 55K6E is a command and control centre based on the Ural-532301 vehicle. The 91N6E is a panoramic radar detection system with a 340 km (210 mi) range and protection against jamming, and is mounted on an MZKT-7930 vehicle. Six battalions of 98ZH6E surface-to-air missile systems (an independent combat system) can track no more than six targets on their own, with an additional two battalions if they are within a 40-kilometre (25 mi) range. The 92N6E (or 92N2E) is a multi-functional radar with a 340-kilometre (210 mi) range, which can track 20 targets. The 5P85TE2 transporter-erector-launcher and the 5P85SE2 on a trailer (up to 12 launchers) are used for launch. The 48N6E, 48N6E2, 48N6E3, 48N6DM, 9M96E, 9M96E2, and the ultra-long-range 40N6E missiles have been authorized by a Russian presidential decree.

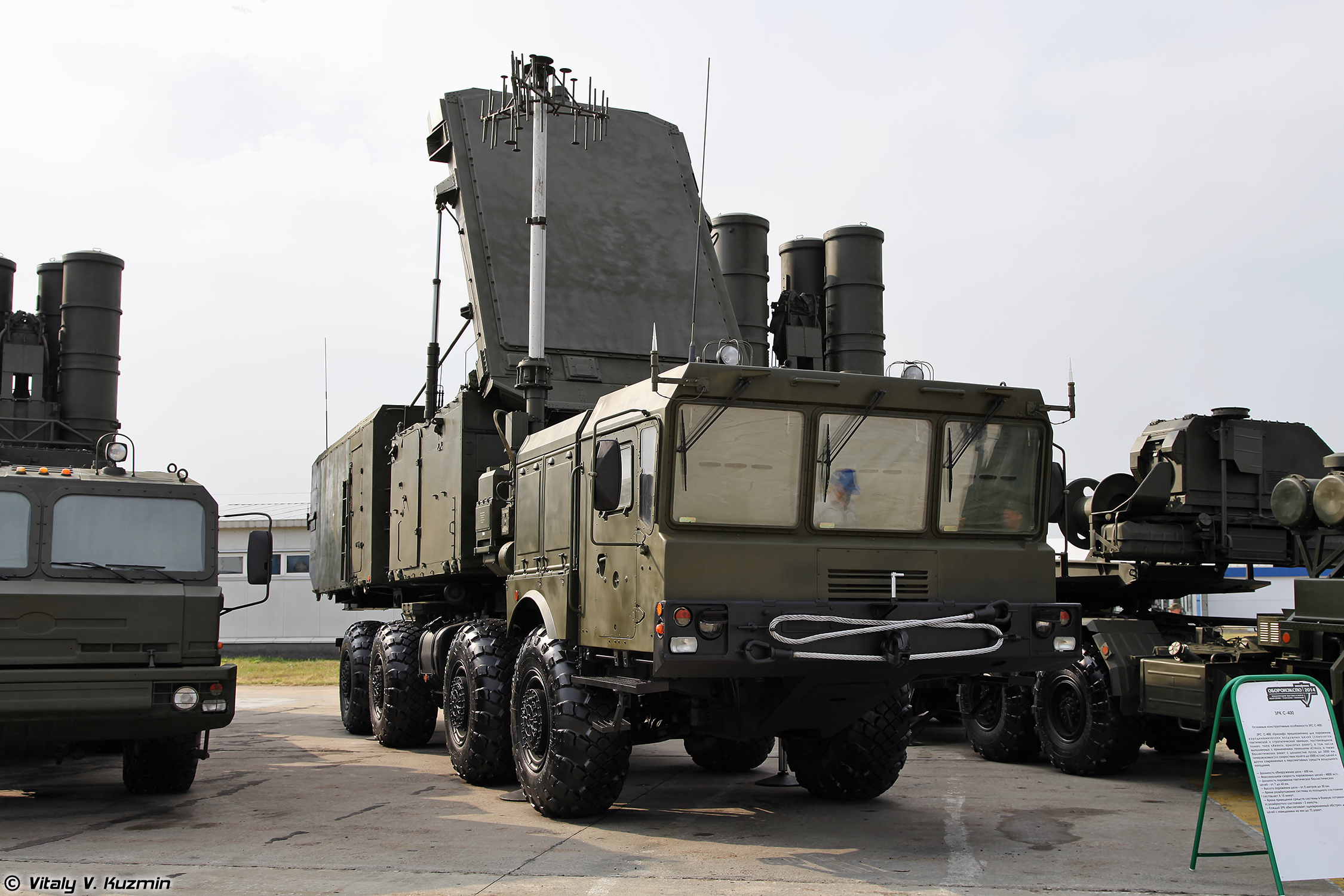
S-400 92N2 radar and 5P85T2

Optional elements of the S-400 (98ZH6E) include the 15I6ME–98ZH6E, which extends coverage 30, 60, and 90 km (19, 38, and 57 mi) from that provided by the 30K6E. The 96L6E has a 300-kilometre (190 mi) detection range. The 40B6M is housing for the 92N6E or 96L6E radar. The Protivnik-GE is an anti-stealth UHF radar with a 400-kilometre (250 mi) range. The Moscow-1 passive sensor is 2 1/2 times more effective than the Protivnik, with a 400-kilometre (250 mi) range Orion for a target-designation on-the-air defence system, and the Avtobaza-M and Orion+ Avtobaza add high-precision detection. The 1RL220BE versions were reportedly used for jamming. The 400-kilometre (250 mi)-range S-200D Dubna (SA-5c) missiles and S-300 P-family radar systems can be used without additional command-and-control centres. S-300 (SA-20A, SA-20B) missiles may also be guided. Beriev A-50 aircraft provide early warning and command-and-control target designation.

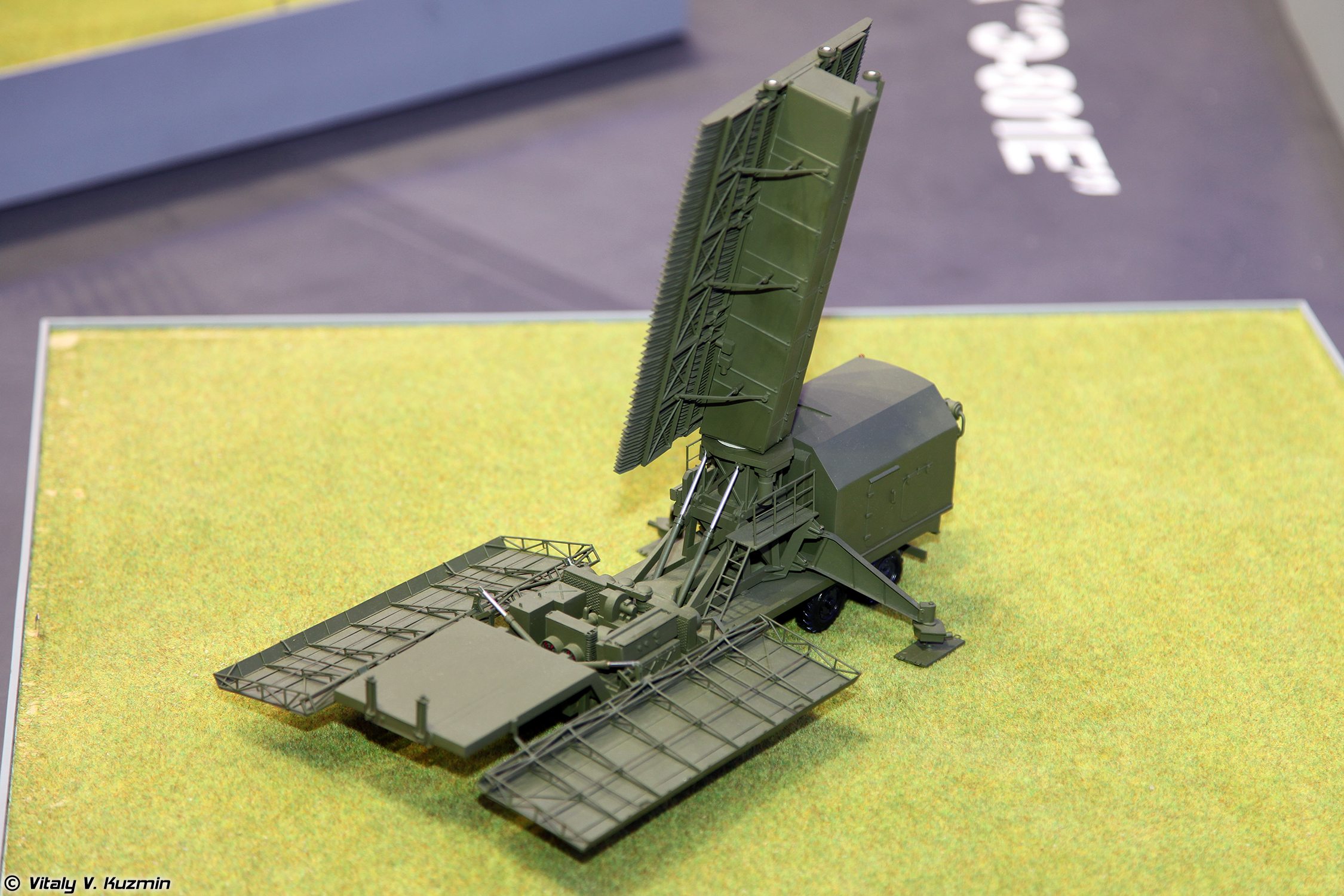
Protivnik-GE model at the 2013 MAKS Airshow

The 30К6Е control system can be integrated with the S-400 Triumf 98ZH6E system; the S-300PMU2 (through the 83М6Е2 control system); the S-300PMU1 (through the 83М6Е control system); the Tor-M1 through the Ranzhir-M battery-command post; the Pantsir-S1 through the lead battery vehicle. The Protivnik-GE and Gamma-DE radars, integrated with the 92H6E radar system, enables communication between each battery with Baikal-E senior command posts and similar types; nearby 30К6Е, 83М6Е and 83М6Е2 administration systems; the Polyana-D4М1 command post; fighter-aircraft command post, and mobile long-range radars. The system's VHF component provides sector search-and-tracking, with the X- and L-band components providing fine-tracking capability. Good placement of the radars relative to the threat axis enables the L- and X-band components to illuminate the incoming target from angles where the target radar cross-section (RCS) is sub-optimal. The RLM-S and RLM-D have better elevation-tracking accuracy than the RLM-M, and the Nebo-M should be capable of producing high-quality tracks suitable for mid-course guidance of modern surface-to-air missiles and trajectory guidance of legacy SAMs.

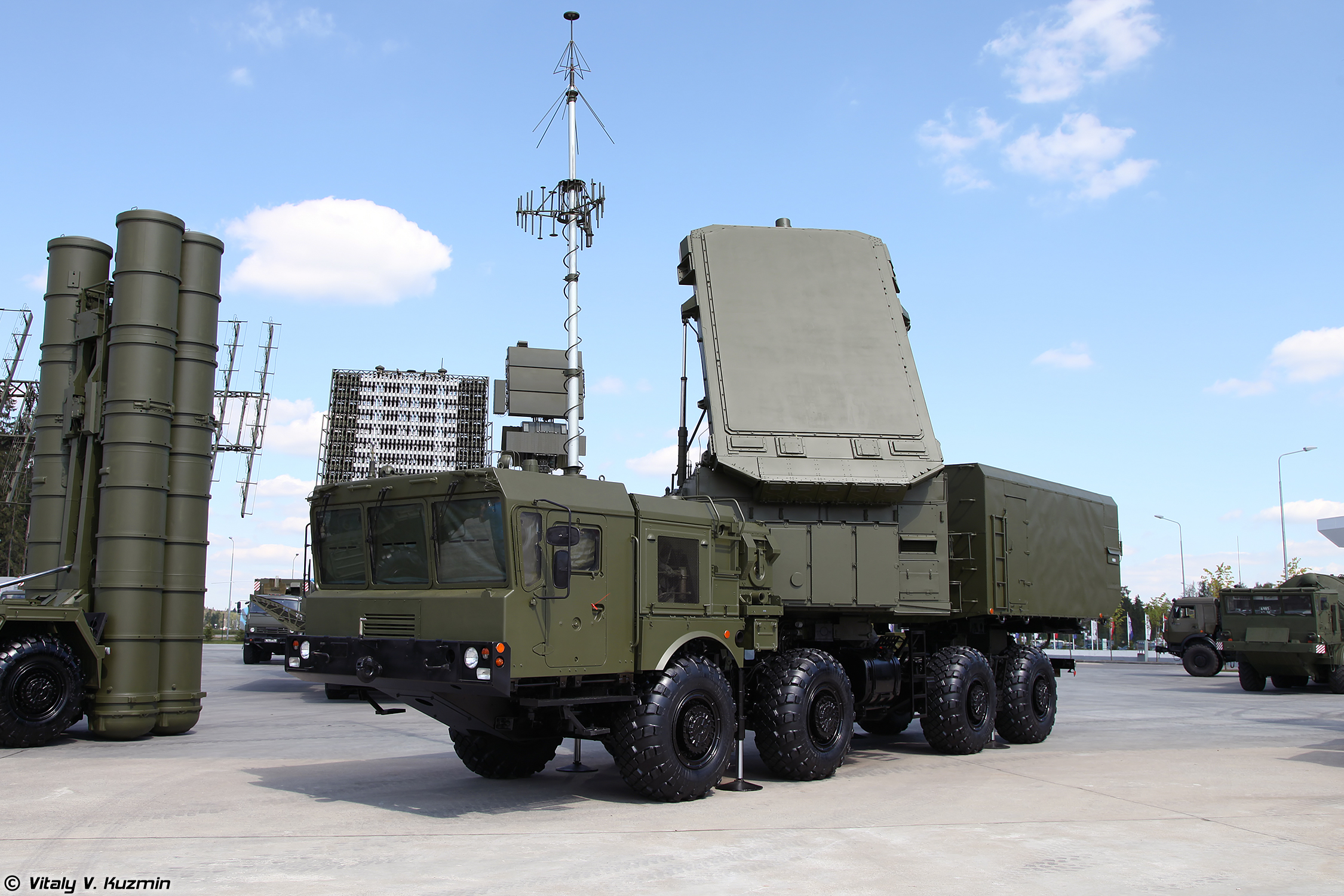
92N6A radar for S-400

The Gamma-C1E SHF mobile radar station has a 300-kilometre (190 mi) detection range. The Nebo-M VHF mobile radar station and the Resonance-NE radar station have a detection range of 400 kilometres (250 mi), and 40 kilometres (25 mi) to an altitude of 500 metres (1,600 ft). All Nebo-family locators are doubled for army air defence. During the 1970s, the long-range mobile UHF 5H87, and SHF 5H69 low-altitude locators were used. A goal of the 1980s was detection at an altitude of 10 metres (33 ft) at a distance of 40 km (25 mi). The Elbrus-90 computer is used to control the system.

=== Components ===
According to the Almaz-Antey product brochure, the 92N6E multi-function radar acts as the primary radar with an actual detection range of 340 km. An interceptor missile is highly dependent on 92N6E multi-function radar rather than Nebo-SVU high-altitude VHF radar.

The 91N6E panoramic radar has a declared targeting range of 150 km (93 mi) Maximum targeting ranges (detection ranges are wider) are:

- For a ballistic target (speed of 4800 m/s and a RCS of 0.4 square metres): 200 km (120 mi)
- For a target with RCS of 4 square metres: 340 km (210 mi)
- For targeting of strategic-bomber sized types: 340 km (210 mi)

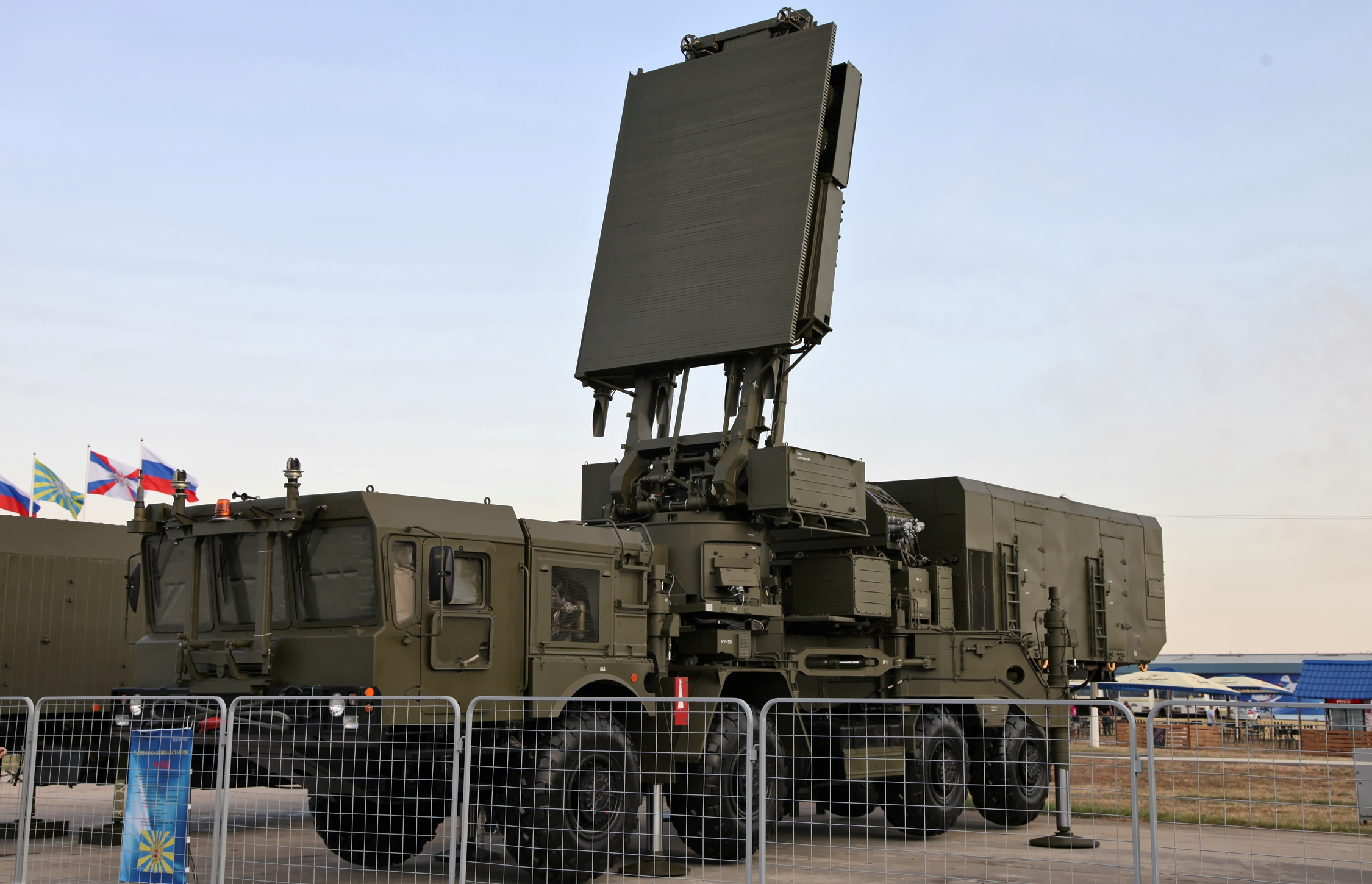
96L6 high-altitude radar

The 96L6 high-altitude detector (TSBS) radar and equipment operates independently of the 96L6E low-level radar detector. The 96L6E2 export version can track a maximum of 20 targets, and is resistant to false returns of clutter in mountainous terrain. It can perform the functions of a command post for battalions of S-300 (SA20/20A/20B) or S-400. The 96L6-1 serves as command of S-400 and S-500 batteries.

- PBU 55K6E command centre with a maximum distance between the command centre and the battalion of 98ZH6E when re-transmitters are being used is 100 km (62 mi).

Missiles are launched from 5P85TE2 self-propelled launchers or 5P85SE2 trailer launchers operating in conjunction with a BAZ-64022 or MAZ-543M tractor-trailer. A new type of transporter was introduced in 2014 to improve mobility while reducing fuel consumption. The cost of transporters in 2014 is 8.7 million rubles. The MAZ launcher chassis are reportedly of higher quality than the domestic equivalent.

=== Missiles ===
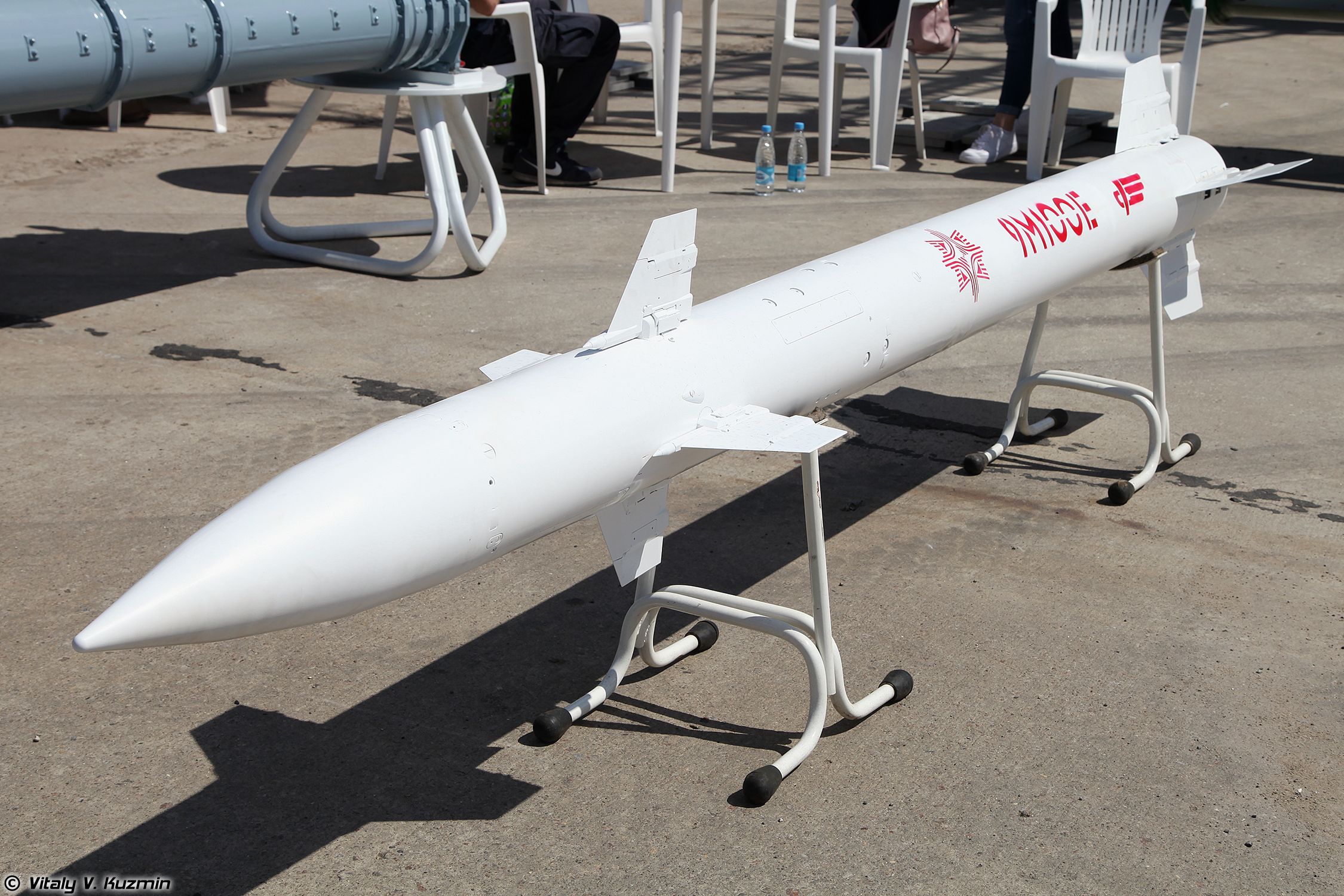
9M100E SAM at the 2017 MAKS airshow

One system comprising eight divizion (battalions) can control 72 launchers, with a maximum of 384 missiles (including missiles with a range of less than 250 km [160 mi]). A gas system launches missiles from launch tubes. At 30 metres (98 ft) downrange rocket motor ignition activates. In April 2015, a successful test firing of the missile was conducted at an airborne target at a range of 400 km (250 mi); transporter erector launchers (TELs) carrying the long-range 40N6 may only hold two missiles instead of the typical four due to their large size. Another test recorded a 9M96 missile using an active radar homing head that reached an altitude of 56 km (35 mi). All missiles are equipped with directed explosion warheads, which increases the probability of complete destruction of aerial targets but are less effective against ballistic targets. In 2016, Russian anti-aircraft missile troops received upgraded guided missiles for S-300 and S-400 defence systems. The anti-aircraft version of the missile system, designed to destroy aircraft, cruise, and ballistic missiles, can also be used against ground targets. The S-400 is able to intercept cruise missiles at a range of only about 40 km (25 mi) due to their low-altitude flight paths.

Missile specifications
GRAU index	Range km (miles)	Altitude km (feet)	Maximum velocity m/s (mph; Mach)	Maximum target velocity m/s (mph; Mach)	Weight kg (lb)	Warhead kg (lb)	Guidance	Notes
40N6E	380 (240)	30 (98,000)	1,190 (2,700; 3.5)	4,800 (11,000; 14)	1,893 (4,173)		Semi-active radar homing or active radar homing	With an active radar homing head, climbs to designated altitude then guidance switches to search & destroy mode.
48N6DM/ 48N6E3	240 (150)	27 (89,000)	2,000 (4,500; 5.9)	4,800 (11,000; 14)	1,835 (4,045)	180 (400)	Semi-active radar homing	
48N6E2	200 (120)	27 (89,000)	2,000 (4,500; 5.9)	2,800 (6,300; 8.2)	1,835 (4,045)	180 (400)	Semi-active radar homing	
9M96 and 9M96E2	120 (75)	30 (98,000)	1,000 (2,200; 2.9)		420 (930)	24 (53)	Active radar homing	Claimed high hit probability with one missile against fast, maneuvering targets. Aircraft = 0.9; UAV = 0.8; Cruise missile = 0.7. Load factor of more than 20 g at 30 (19) altitude greatly increases the probability to destroy short- to medium-range ballistic missiles.
9M96E	40 (25)	20 (66,000)	900 (2,000; 2.6)		333 (734)	24 (53)	Active radar homing	
9M100E								

- The anti-ballistic missile (ABM) capabilities of the S-400 system are near the maximum allowed under the (now void) Anti-Ballistic Missile Treaty.
- The new anti-ballistic missiles 77N6-N and 77N6-N1 to enter service in 2022 supposedly add inert/kinetic anti-ballistic capability to the S-400 system and are too large for the SA-20. The same missiles will also be used by the S-500, which has a clearly stated ABM role.

==== Missile gallery ====
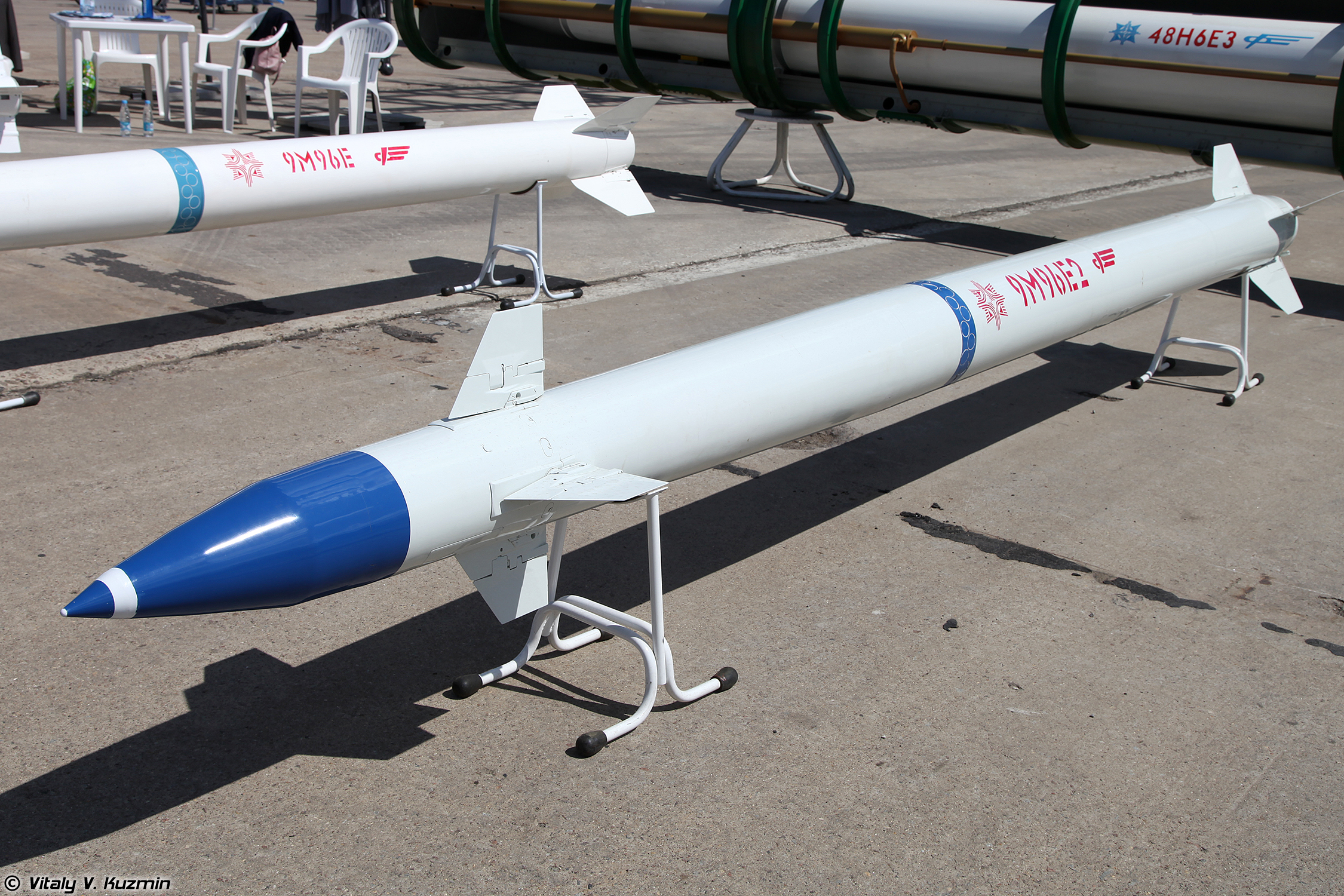
9M96E2 SAM at the 2017 MAKS airshow

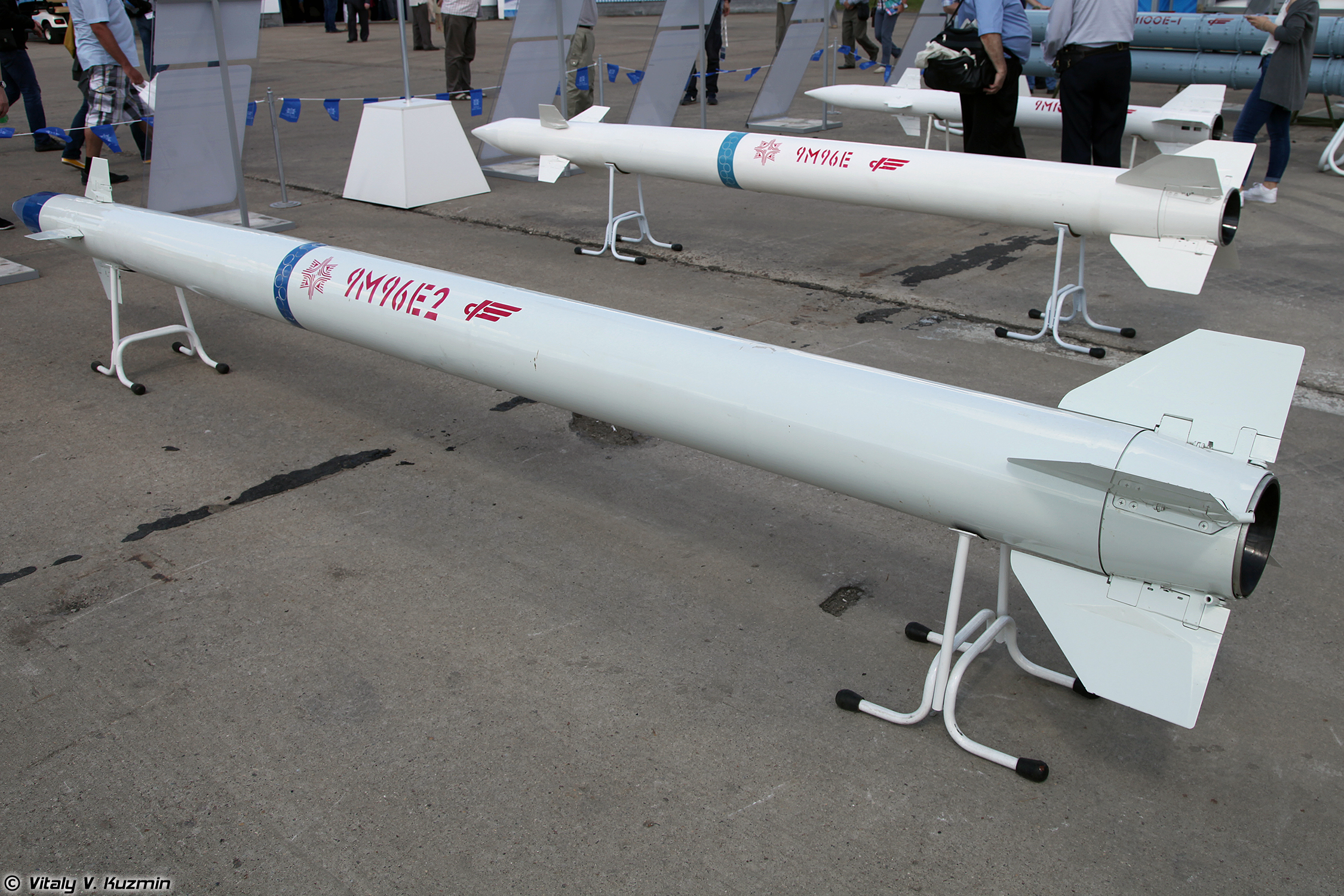
9M96E2 SAM at the 2017 MAKS airshow

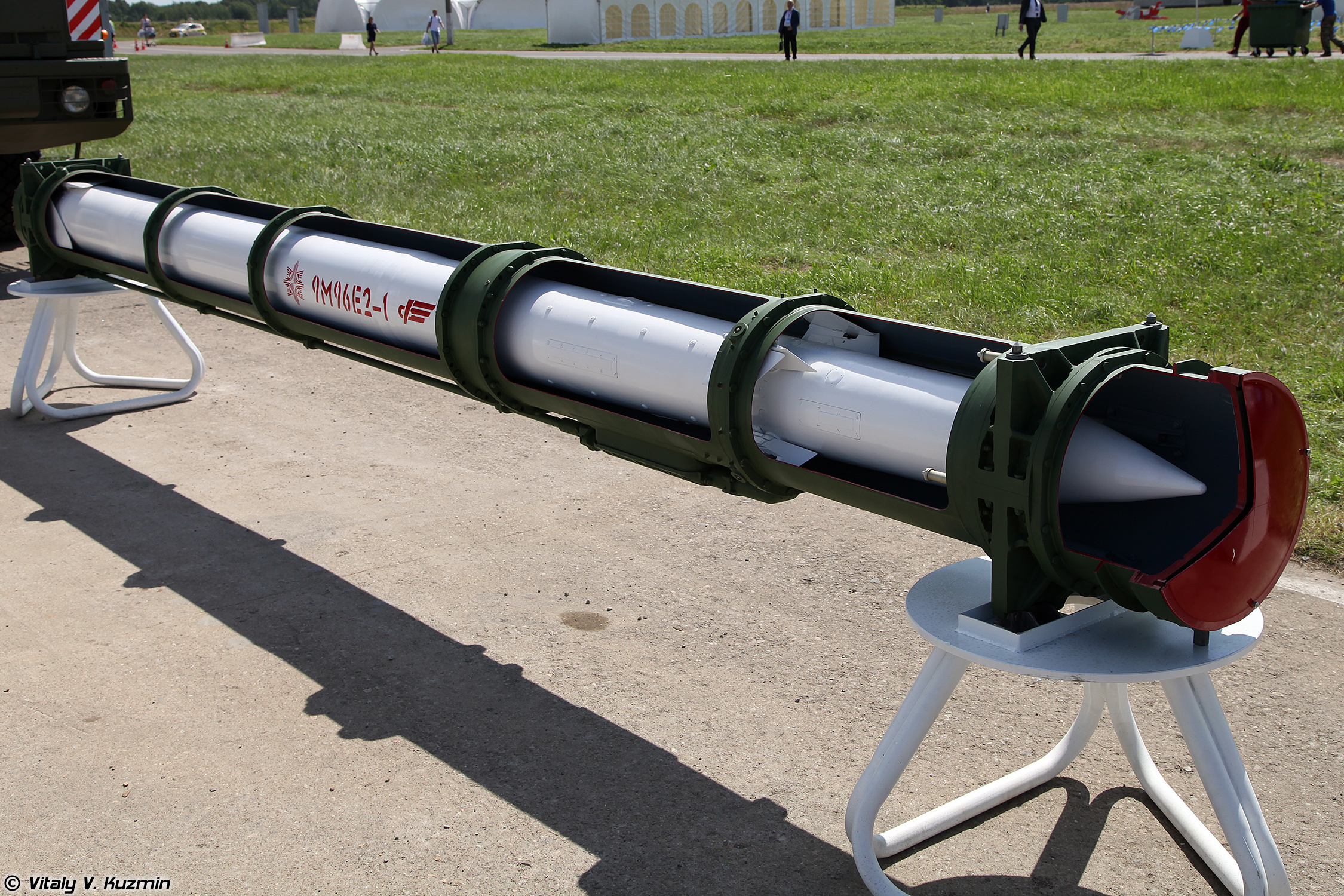
9M96E2-1 at the 2017 MAKS airshow

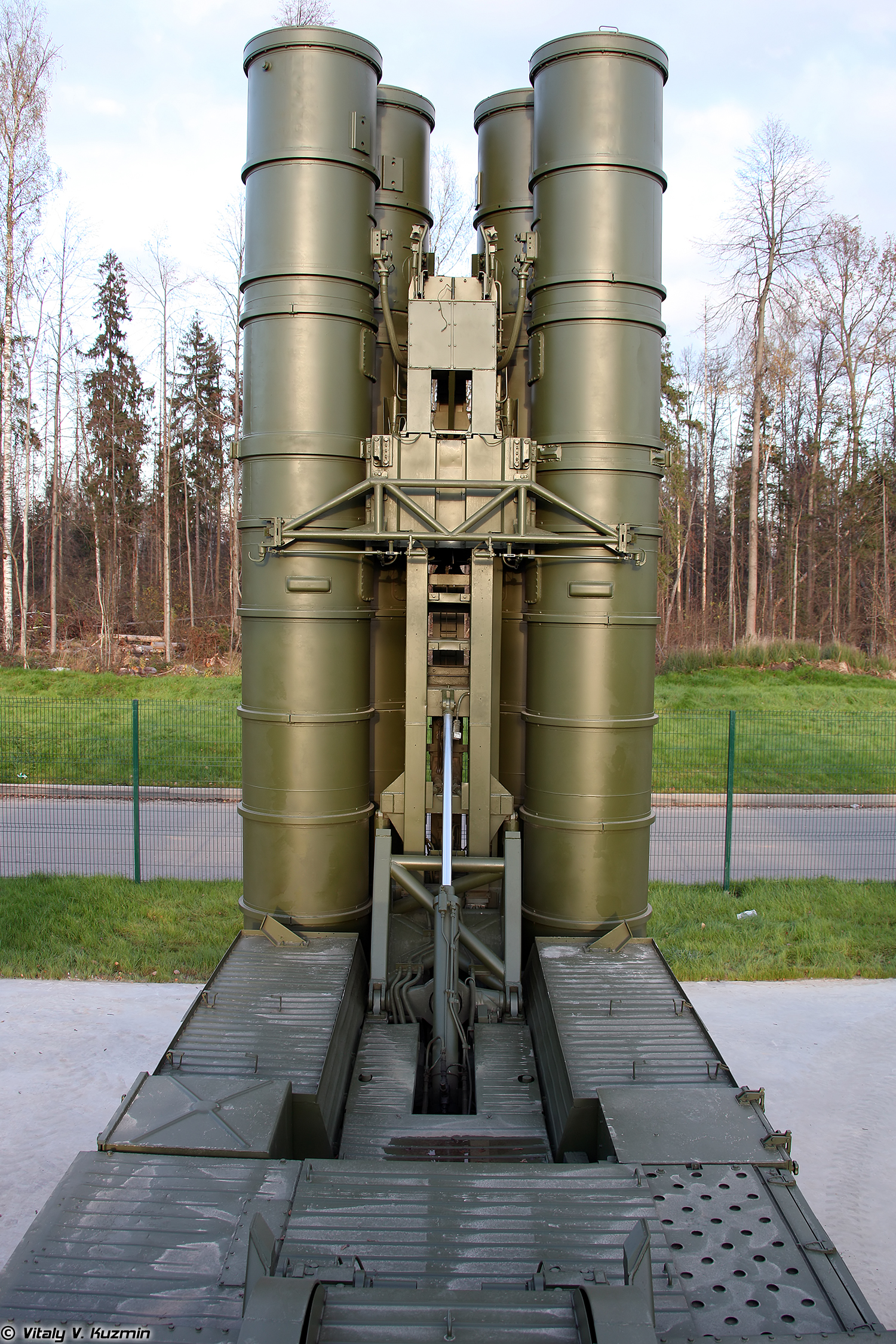
5P85TM TEL for S-400 missile system

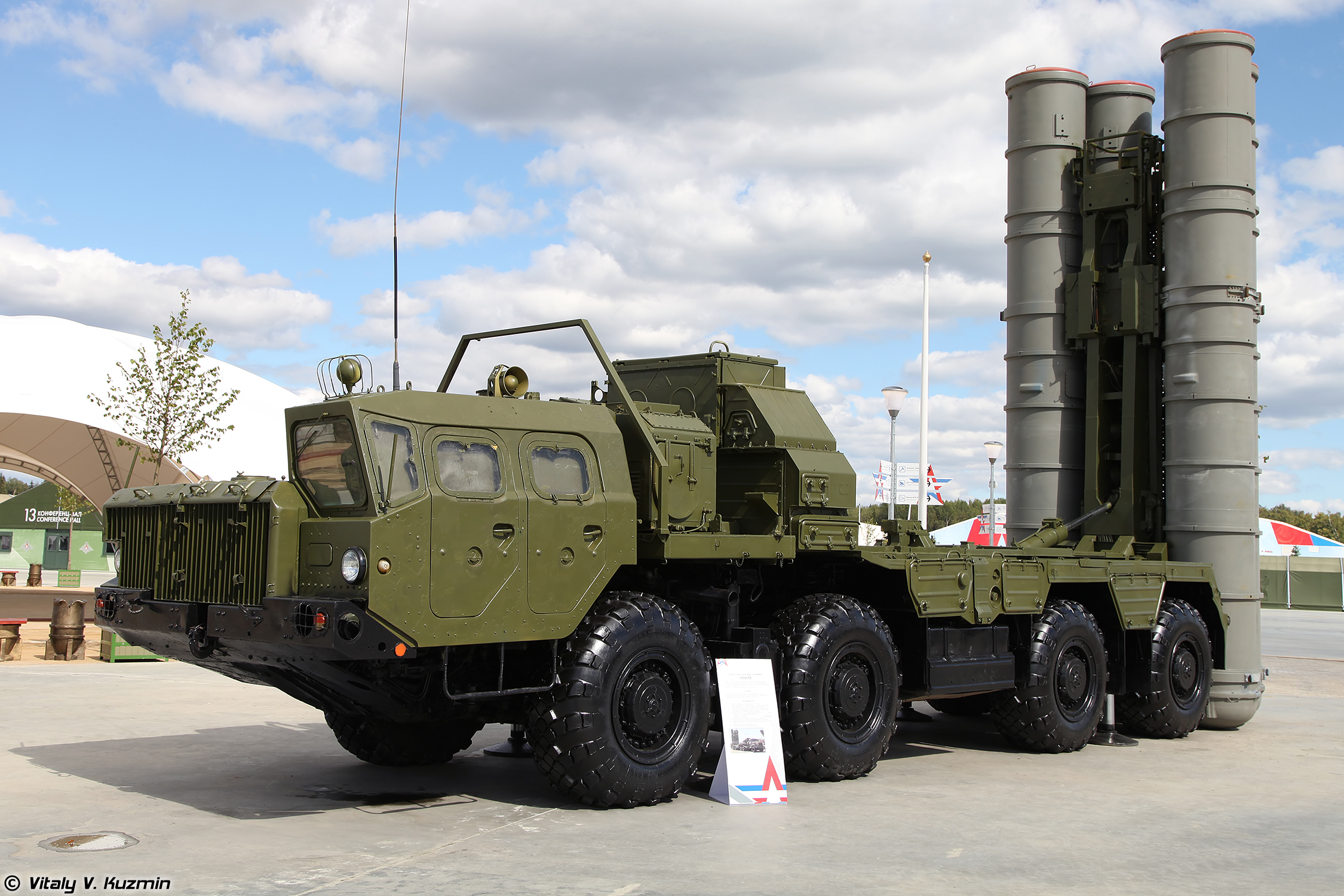
5P85SE2 TEL for S-300PM2

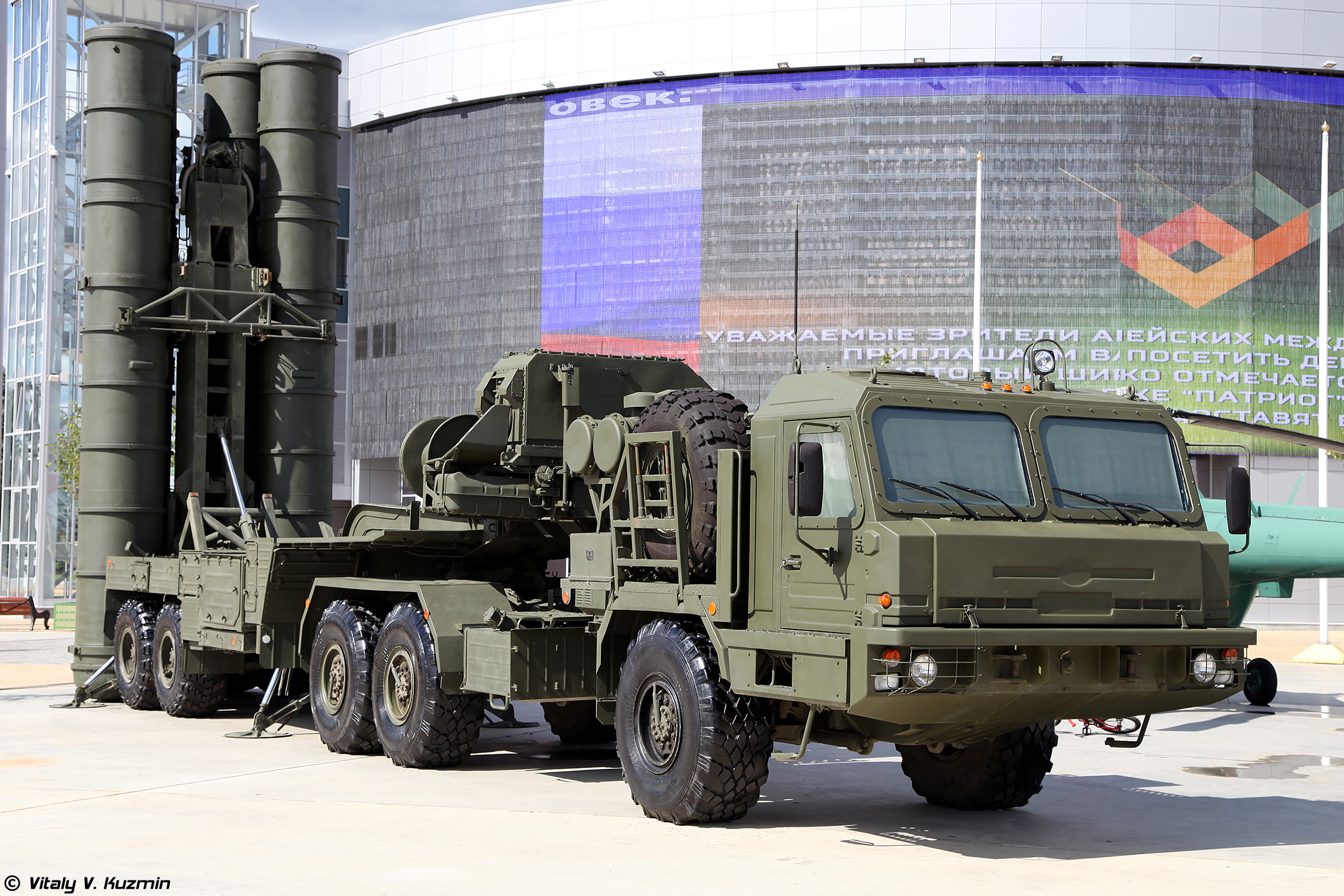
5P85TE2 TEL

S-400 firing in 2020 at the Ashuluk Training Ground

S-400 firing in 2013 at the Ashuluk Training Ground

S-400 firing during Kavkaz 2020 exercise

=== S-300 system family tree ===
S-300 family
S-300V	S-300P	S-300F
S-300V1	S-300V2	S-300PT	S-300PS	Fort	Rif
S-300VM	S-300PT-1	S-300PM	S-300PMU	Fort-M	Rif-M
Favorit-S
S-300VM1	S-300VM2	S-300PT-1A	S-300PM1	S-300PMU1
Antey 2500	S-300PM2	S-300PMU2	Russian Ver.
S-300V4	Favorit	Export Ver.
S-300VMD	S-400

=== Morpheus defence system ===
- A separate independent air defence system, the 42S6 Morfey (Morpheus) is being developed. This system is designated as a short-range air defence system to protect the S-400 from various threats during its terminal phase, and will also act together with the S-350E as a supplement to the S-400. Together, these systems form part of the Russian Aerospace Defence Forces.
- Development of Morfey started in 2007 and was planned to be introduced in 2013, but was delayed until at least 2015, in 2023 the development is not completed. The missile system consists of omnidirectional 29YA6 radar and 36 missiles. The missiles have up to 10 km (6.2 mi) range and an altitude of up to 3500 m.
- An external independent target system is in the works (RLS "Niobium"). Mobility looks to be in the 5 minute range. It uses multiple frequency capability (band S and UHF) with a declared detection parameter of a 1 square meter RCS at 430 km (270 mi) including a target speed of 8000 km/h (4791 mph, Mach 6.35). The detection system requires the operator to transfer command of targeting to subordinate systems; in this application, the maximum target speed is obtained by use of the subordinate systems.

== Specifications ==
Main characteristics of the S-400
Max. target speed	4.8 km/s (17,000 km/h; 11,000 mph; Mach 14) or lower than 850 metres per second (3,100 km/h; 1,900 mph; Mach 2.5)
Max. Target detection distance (km)	600
Range against aerodynamic target (km): maximum; minimum	400; 2
Altitude limits for aerodynamic target (2015, km): maximum; minimum	27 (easily)/30
Range against tactical ballistic targets (km): maximum; minimum	60; 5
The number of simultaneously engaged targets (full system)	36
The number of simultaneously guided missiles (full system)	72, can use 2 missiles to attack 1 target
Ready for operation on a signal from driving on the march	5 min; 10–15 min during development
Ready for operation on a signal from standby	ready and enabled 35 sec; ready 3 min
Time between major overhauls	10,000 hours
Service life: ground facilities; anti-aircraft guided missiles	At least 20 years 10 years

- Types of targets:
  - Aerial targets
  - Ballistic missiles with low probability (range up to 3,500 km)
- All-purpose maximum radial velocity is 4.8 kilometres per second (17,000 km/h; 11,000 mph; Mach 14); absolute limit 5 kilometres per second (18,000 km/h; 11,000 mph; Mach 15), the minimum target speed is zero.
- System response time 9–10 seconds.
- The complex can move on roads at 60 km/h (37 mph) and off-road at speeds up to 25 km/h (16 mph).
- According to the Pravda state newspaper, the price of one battalion (about 7–8 launchers) is US$200 million.

== Deployment history ==
=== Russia ===
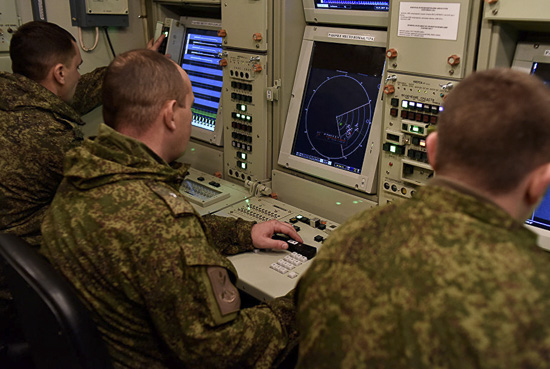
S-400 crew on duty

On 21 May 2007 the Russian Air Force announced that S-400 systems would be put on combat duty near the town of Elektrostal in Moscow Oblast, to defend Moscow and Central Russia, by 1 July 2007. On 6 August 2007 the first regiment equipped with S-400 systems entered active service near Elektrostal, according to Channel One Russia. The regiment was the 606th Guards Anti-air Rocket Regiment, 9th PVO Division, 1st PVO Corps, of the Special Purpose Command.

On 8 February 2008 Lt. Gen. Vladimir Sviridov announced that Russia would be replacing the S-300 systems in the northwest of Russia with the S-400. Military experts expect Russia's use of the system as a major component of their ballistic missile defence until 2020.

In September 2006 Deputy Prime Minister Sergei Ivanov announced the purchase of 18 S-400 battalions for internal defence for the period 2007–2015.

The Baltic Fleet in Kaliningrad received S-400 SAM systems which went into operational status in April 2012. One S-400 divizion is deployed on combat duty in the Russian far east city of Nakhodka.

As of 2012, one system (in Electrostal) was operational, with three more S-400 battalions being deployed. All 56 battalions will be delivered by 2020.

Russia plans to recommission the Kirov-class battlecruiser Admiral Nakhimov in 2023. Plans called for the installation of the 48N6DMK anti-aircraft missile derived from the land-based S-400. This will extend the Kirov's air defence from 100 km (62 mi; 54 nmi) to 250 km (160 mi; 130 nmi). Adm. Vladimir Korolev stated at that time that Russia's Northern Fleet's Coastal Forces had deployed S-400s.

On 1 March 2016 the acting commander of the 14th Air Force and Air Defense Army, major general Vladimir Korytkov, said that six S-400 units had been activated at the air defence formation in Russia's Novosibirsk Oblast. TASS also reported that as of the end of 2015, a total of eleven Russian missile regiments were armed with S-400, and by the end of 2016 their number was expected to increase to sixteen.

==== 2015 – Syria ====
It was reported in November 2015 that S-400s would be deployed to Syria along with the contingent of Russian troops and other military hardware in the course of the air campaign conducted by the Russian forces in support of the Syrian government. However, those claims were refuted by Russia. On 25 November 2015 the Russian government announced it would deploy S-400s in Syria as a response to the downing of its Su-24M jet by Turkey. By the next day, deployment of S-400 air defence systems to Syria was underway. The first S-400 unit was activated at the Khmeimim Air Base in Latakia Governorate. In April and July 2017 a second S-400 unit was activated 13 km (8.1 mi) northwest of Masyaf, Hama Governorate. Although these systems are located in Syria, they are under the command of the Russian military and not the Syrian (nor Iranian) military, making the Russian government liable if used against another state (that is, its use would be considered an attack by Russia rather than Syria).

On 22 May 2018 Israeli Air Force commander Major General Amikam Norkin reported that Israel became the first country in the world to use the F-35I Adir in combat during recent clashes with Iran in Syria. In mid-2020, several media outlets, including Turkish media, questioned the combat capability of the S-400 air defence system. In late December 2021, the Israeli Air Force flew military jets over areas protected by S-400 and Pantsir SAM in Syria and bombed Iran-backed Hezbollah militia based in Latakia. Russia operates a naval base in the port of Tartus, 85 km (53 mi) to the south near the port of Latakia. Considering the engagement range advertised by the Russians, the S-400 could have engaged Israeli aircraft but did not. Neither Russian fighter jets nor the S-400 systems attempted to intercept the Israeli aircraft. It is widely believed that Russia and Israel have an agreement that Israel will guarantee the safety of Russian personnel and assets during its strikes on non-Russian targets in Syria and in return, Russia will not target Israeli aircraft nor repel Israeli strikes.

==== 2022 – Ukraine ====
Initial Ukrainian sources claimed that, on 25 February 2022, the Su-27 of Ukrainian Colonel Oleksandr Oksanchenko was shot down by an S-400 over Kyiv.

On 14 April 2022, the Russian Defence Ministry claimed that a Ukrainian Mi-8 was shot down by a S-400 near Horodnia, Chernihiv Oblast on its way to an air base following an attack on Russian territory near Klimovo, Bryansk Oblast.

In August 2022, Ukraine claimed that a 92N6E radar used in the S-400 SAM system was destroyed in Kherson region.

On 16 October 2023, units from the Ukrainian Special Operations Forces carried out precision strikes targeting two key Russian airbases in Berdiansk and Luhansk destroying S-400 surface-to-air missiles.

On 30 October 2023, Ukraine launched ATACMS missiles with M39 munition that destroyed Russia's S-400 surface-to-air missile in Luhansk Oblast.

On 23 August 2023, GRU released a video of two alleged elements of an S-400 battery being destroyed in Olenivka, Crimea, 120 km (75 mi) south of Kherson, by a barrage of Ukrainian missiles. Ukrainian forces, according to Ukrainian media, used a R-360 Neptune and a drone to destroy the missile's radar.

On 14 September 2023, Ukraine claimed to have destroyed a Russian S-400's radar near Yevpatoria, Crimea. On 4 October 2023, Ukrainian kamikaze drone destroyed one radar and a missile launcher of S-400 system in Belgorod region.

In late October 2023, Russian sources claimed that the S-400 was used in conjunction with the Beriev A-50 flying radar to shoot at Ukrainian air targets with new warheads of anti-aircraft guided missiles.

On 9 November 2023, the UK MoD intelligence assessment indicated that due to the destruction of "several" Russian S-400s in Ukraine, Russia may have to redeploy S-400 systems from "distant parts" of Russia's borders to Ukraine.

On 19 April 2024, Ukraine launched ATACMS missiles at Russian military airfield in Crimea and destroyed Russia's S-400 launchers, three radars and Fundament-M air surveillance system.

On 23 April 2024, Ukraine's Tivaz Artillery Battery launched American-made HIMARS at Russia's S-400 missile system's 92N2 radar and 96L6 high-altitude radar and destroyed both of the radar system.

On 28 April 2024, Ukraine launched multiple ATACMS missiles at Russian based in the occupied Crimean peninsula and destroyed Russian S-400 air defence systems.

On 6 May 2024, Ukrainian forces reportedly destroyed a tracked version of Russian S-400 missile launcher in the occupied Zaporizhzhia region.

On 30 May 2024, the Security Service of Ukraine (SBU) destroyed a Russian Nebo-SVU long-range VHF surveillance radar system in Crimea. The Nebo-SVU is a surveillance radar deployed as part of the S-400 missile system.

Russians have been reported to use reprogrammed S-400 missiles to launch ballistic ground-to-ground attacks. In one such attack on 13 December 2023 out of 10 missiles fired at Kyiv, all were supposedly downed, but falling debris still caused some damage in residential regions. The missiles were most likely reprogrammed 48N6.

On 3 June 2024, Ukrainian forces destroyed for the first time an S-400 air defence missile system in Belgorod using a U.S.-supplied M142 HIMARS rocket launcher.

On 10 June 2024, Ukrainian forces struck a Russian antiaircraft missile system, including S-400 missile launchers in the Dzhankoy area in Crimea. According to a Newsweek report, visual confirmation and satellite mapping confirmed that Russia lost fifteen air defence systems in Crimea, including missile launchers, power supply units and radar stations to Ukrainian ATACMS and drone strikes.

On 2 August 2024, Ukraine struck four Russian S-400 surface-to-air missile systems in Crimea. According to CNN news, four S-400 systems were severely damaged by the Ukrainian attacks.

On 24 November 2024, Ukraine struck one Russian S-400 surface-to-air missile systems in Kursk region. The S-400 missile launchers were targeted by U.S.-made ATACMS missile.

On 27 January 2025, videos emerged of a 96L6E radar of the S-400 reportedly being hit by a Ukrainian HIMARS missile.

On 29 August 2025, a video emerged of a Russian 91N6E radar of the S-400 reportedly being hit in Crimea by a Ukrainian drone.

=== Belarus ===
In 2011 State Secretary of the Union State of Russia and Belarus Pavel Borodin stated that Russia will supply the S-400 air defence system to Belarus. On 1 December 2021 Belarus President Alexander Lukashenko, in response to a reporter's question, replied that a Belarusian training centre already has S-400 systems. The president said: "Yes. We train our guys in this training center. I'd like to ask the president [of Russia] to leave this system here."

=== China ===
In March 2014, it was announced that Russian president Vladimir Putin had given authorization to sell the S-400 system to China. On 13 April 2015, the chief executive of the Russian state-run arms trader Rosoboronexport confirmed that China secured a contract for the purchase of the S-400 air defence system. Delivery of the system began in January 2018. China test fired Russian S-400 systems for the first time in early August 2018. Deliveries were reportedly postponed after the delivery of two S-400 units.

The acquisition of S-400, reported to initially consist of six batteries, improves China's air space defence. A reported 400 km (250 mi) coverage range would allow China's defence to cover all of the Taiwan Straits and the Diaoyu Islands. Taiwan plans countermeasures using signals intelligence units to locate and destroy S-400 systems before they can be used.

=== Turkey ===
In late 2017 Turkish and Russian officials signed a US$2.5 billion agreement for delivery of the S-400 air defence system to Turkey. The US Secretary of State raised concerns over the deal, which were rebuffed by President Erdogan and other Turkish officials, citing the US refusal to sell the upgraded MIM-104 Patriot to Turkey, considered to be an important American ally by the US. Turkey received its first installment of the Russian S-400 missile defence system on 12 July 2019. On 17 July 2019, Turkey was suspended from the F-35 program, the US stating "F-35 cannot coexist with a Russian intelligence collection platform that will be used to learn about its advanced capabilities" and on 14 December 2020, the US imposed CAATSA sanctions on Turkey. As of 2020, 4 batteries consisting of 36 fire units and 192 or more missiles were delivered to Turkey.

=== India ===
==== Contracts ====
A deal to purchase S-400 systems by India was first reported in October 2015. On 15 October 2016, during the BRICS Summit, India and Russia signed an Inter-governmental Agreement (IGA) for the supply of five S-400 regiments to India. On 1 July 2018, the Defence Acquisition Council (DAC), chaired by the then Defence Minister Nirmala Sitharaman, cleared the procurement. The deliveries were expected to commence within 24 months after contract signing (October 2020) while they would complete all deliveries within 60 months (April 2023). On 26 September 2018, the Cabinet Committee on Security (CCS), headed by the prime minister Narendra Modi further cleared the acquisition. The US$5.43 billion deal (₹40,000 crore) was formally signed on 5 October 2018, ignoring the threat of US sanctions.

In March 2021, U.S. Secretary of Defense Lloyd Austin discussed India's planned purchase of Russia's S-400 air missile system and warned that the purchase of S-400 could trigger CAATSA sanctions.

On 5 August 2025, the Defence Acquisition Council (DAC) accorded the Acceptance of Necessity (AoN) for the comprehensive annual maintenance contract of S-400 missile systems. Russia is expected to set up an MRO facility in India for the missile system.

In October, it was reported that top officials from the Indian defence ministry is expected to meet their Russian counterparts for the purchase of five additional systems of S-400. These systems will be either directly delivered from Russia or jointly manufactured in India. The cost of these systems will be based on the 2018 deal except for compensating the annual price escalations. The deal was expected to be cleared before the scheduled visit of Russian president, Vladimir Putin, to India on 5 December. Reports also debunked the purchase of any S-500 missile system by India. The purchase is one of the agenda during the Modi-Putin discussions.

As reported on 21 October 2025, the DAC is expected to approve a deal worth ₹10,000 crore (equivalent to ₹100 billion or US$1.1 billion in 2026) to procure 280 missiles to equip the S-400 systems. The approval is expected to be granted during the DAC meet scheduled on 23 October. By 28 November, a Request for Proposal was soon expected to be issued to Rosoboronexport. This would be followed by clearance from the Cost Negotiation Committee (CNC) and Cabinet Committee on Security (CCS), with the deal set to be finalised by the end of fiscal year.

On 12 February 2026, the DAC accorded the Acceptance of Necessity (AoN) for the purchase of 120 short-range missiles and 168 long-range missiles under Fast Track Procurement (FTP) mode. The Air Force is also preparing a case for acquisition of five additional S-400 systems as well as Pantsir missile system. These missiles are expected to replenish stocks that were spent during the 2025 India-Pakistan conflict. The project is in the request for proposal stage as of April 2026.

The case for acquisition of five more S-400 squadrons was cleared by the Defence Procurement Board chaired by the Defence Secretary, Rajesh Kumar Singh on 3 March 2026. The entire system will be acquired directly from Russia and will be maintained by a private company. The proposal will be taken up in by the Defence Acquisition Council (DAC), the Cost Negotiation Committee (CNC) and the Cabinet Committee on Security (CCS). The DAC cleared the procurement on 27 March 2026. The expected cost is ₹63,000 crore (US$6.1 billion).

On 5 September 2026, reports indicated that Russia sent the Bill of Quantities (BoQ) as a response to India's acquisition of five S-400 squadrons. The BoQ contains the cost of construction and materials. This will be followed by cost negotiation and finalisation. The final approvals will then be given by the Indian Ministry of Finance and the CCS, respectively.

==== Delivery and deployment ====
either scheduled or estimated dates
Unit Name	Delivered	Deployed at	Ref.
First batch
First squadron	December 2021	Along the Line of Control (LoC) in Pathankot region (mostly at the Adampur base and Udhampur base) to protect Punjab-Jammu & Kashmir sector.	
Training squadron	April 2022	Received simulators and other equipment for a training regiment	
Second squadron	July 2022	Along the Line of Actual Control (LAC) in Sikkim sector.	
Third squadron	February 2023	Rajasthan-Gujarat sector, based around AFS Bhuj	
Fourth squadron	May 2026	Rajasthan-Punjab sector	
Fifth squadron	January 2027	Northeast India	

Delivery of the last two systems are likely to be dependent on the resolution of issues such as insurance and establishment of mechanism for balance payments which are delayed due to sanctions on Russia due to Russo-Ukrainian war. Delivery expectations were later revised to August 2026.

In February 2025, it was reported that in the fourth squadron is to be delivered by the end of the year while the last squadron would be delivered by 2026. As of November 2025, Both the squadrons are now expected to be delivered by November 2026. According to a report on 1 April 2026, an IAF pre-delivery inspection team (PIT), consisting of multiple officers, is in Russia for 10 days to accept fourth squadron. The pre-dispatch inspection by IAF officials was completed by April. The shipment sailed from a Russian port on 28 April and will be received at an Indian port by mid-May and deployed thereafter. The fifth system will be shipped in November and is expected to be deployed in the "middle sector" of India's border with China.

The fourth squadron was received by late May and was to be fielded soon. However, the fifth squadron was delayed again and is expected in January 2027 after a pre-dispatch team reaches Russia in December 2026.

==== Organization ====
The S-400 system is named Sudarshan Chakra in Indian service, after Sudarshan Chakra and is unified with the Integrated Air Command and Control System (IACCS). Each battalion is composed of two batteries. Each battery (or firing unit) is equipped with 6 launchers, a radar and a control centre with 128 missiles. A battalion has a total of 16 vehicles. India bought a total of 60 launchers with around 6,000 missiles including 9M96E2 (120 km), 48N6E2 (200 km), 48N6E3 (240 km) and 40N6E (380 km).

==== Service history ====
In July 2024, during an air defence exercise of the Indian Air Force, the S-400 system 'shot down' 80% of the 'aggressor aircraft'. Some Indian jets were used as aggressor jets which were tracked, targeted and locked on by the S-400 system.

==== 2025 India–Pakistan conflict ====
India claimed that its S-400 air defence system had performed well during the conflict. On 10 May 2025, it was claimed by several Indian media outlets that an IAF S‑400 system intercepted and destroyed a PAF AWACS aircraft approximately 314 km inside Pakistani airspace. Approximatly 11 long range interceptors, along with multiple short range interceptors were fired over Pakistan. In August 2025, almost three months after the conflict, Indian Air Chief Marshal Amar Preet Singh claimed that India had, in May, shot down five Pakistani fighters. Singh also stated that in addition, a "large aircraft" had been shot down at a distance of 300 km, and described it as the "largest-ever recorded surface-to-air kill that we can talk about". The Marshall attributed most of the downed aircraft to the S-400 system. Pakistan has rejected these claims due to a lack of independent verification and confirmation. Pakistan had also denied losing any aircraft during the brief conflict.

During the 2025 India–Pakistan conflict, the Pakistan Air Force had claimed they destroyed components of India's S‑400 air defence system deployed at Adampur Air Force Station. The Indian Ministry of External Affairs however rejected Pakistan's claim of damage to the S-400 system. Later, the Prime Minister of India Narendra Modi visited the Adampur Air Force Station in Punjab on 13 May 2025, and posed in front of an S-400 system in the background that at least visually appeared undamaged.

==== Post-conflict deployment ====
The system was presented as a part of India's Republic day parade in 2026.

== Foreign interest ==
=== Saudi Arabia ===
In September 2009 the S-400 was reportedly part of a US$2 billion arms deal between Russia and Saudi Arabia. The Saudis wanted to acquire the S-400, but Russia was only willing to sell S-300 air defence system at the time. By November 2019 the deal had still not been finalized. Saudi Arabia is no longer considering the Russian S-400 air defence system, following the kingdom's deal for an American alternative. The American Terminal High Altitude Area Defense (THAAD) system has been cleared for sale to the Saudis by the U.S. State Department. The sale of the THAAD package sold to Saudi Arabia is estimated at $15 billion in 2017 dollars.

=== Iran ===
In June 2019 some Iranian officials expressed interest in procuring the S-400 missile system to further improve its defence capabilities along with the previously purchased S-300PMU2. Russia stated at the time it was ready to sell the S-400 system to Iran if an official request was made. In November 2024, Davood Sheikhian, deputy for operations of the IRGC Aerospace Force, stated that Iran never requested the S-400 systems, and that Iran's current capabilities were far superior to them, additionally stating that Iran is actively using the S-300. This is in contradiction both to reports from Iran's media outlets addressing its attempts to acquire the S-400, and to other reports of the disabling of all active S-300 systems belonging to Iran during Israeli airstrikes. An Iranian lawmaker said on 23 September 2025 that S-400s are being supplied to Iran "in significant numbers".

=== Egypt ===
In February 2017 Sergey Chemezov, CEO of Rostec, stated that Egypt was interested in the S-400 air defence system. He explained that Russia offered to sell Egypt either the Antey-2500 or S-400. According to Chemezov, the negotiations were delayed due to Egypt's financial issues.

=== Iraq ===
In February 2018 Iraqi Minister of Foreign Affairs Ibrahim al-Jaafari confirmed ongoing rumours that his country had shown interest in the S-400 and that negotiations with Russia were underway. In May 2019 Iraq's ambassador to Russia, Haidar Mandour Hadi, said the Iraqi government had decided to procure the S-400 air defence system.

=== United States ===
In June 2020 United States senator John Thune proposed an amendment to the (ultimately unsuccessful) Senate version of the 2021 National Defense Authorization Act to allow the US Department of Defense to purchase Turkey's S-400 system with funds from the U.S. Army's missile procurement account, thus negating Turkey's contravention of the CAATSA sanctions. This was an attempt to allow Turkey to re-enter the F-35 Lightning II acquisition and ownership program.

=== Serbia ===
Serbia had initially expressed interest in the S-400 system in 2019, but later abandoned efforts to procure it by 2025, opting instead for the Chinese HQ-9BE (FD-2000B) in order to complement its existing HQ-22E (FK-3) batteries.

== Foreign variant ==
=== South Korea ===
South Korea is developing the M-SAM, a medium-range SAM system based on technology from the 9M96 missile, with assistance from NPO Almaz. The prime contractor is Hanwha Group (formerly Samsung-Thales, a defunct joint venture between South Korea's Samsung and France's Thales). The KM-SAM will consist of an X-band multifunction radar vehicle built by Hanwha in technical cooperation with Almaz, with fire control and TEL vehicles built by Doosan. Missiles will be provided by LIG Nex1.

== Operators ==
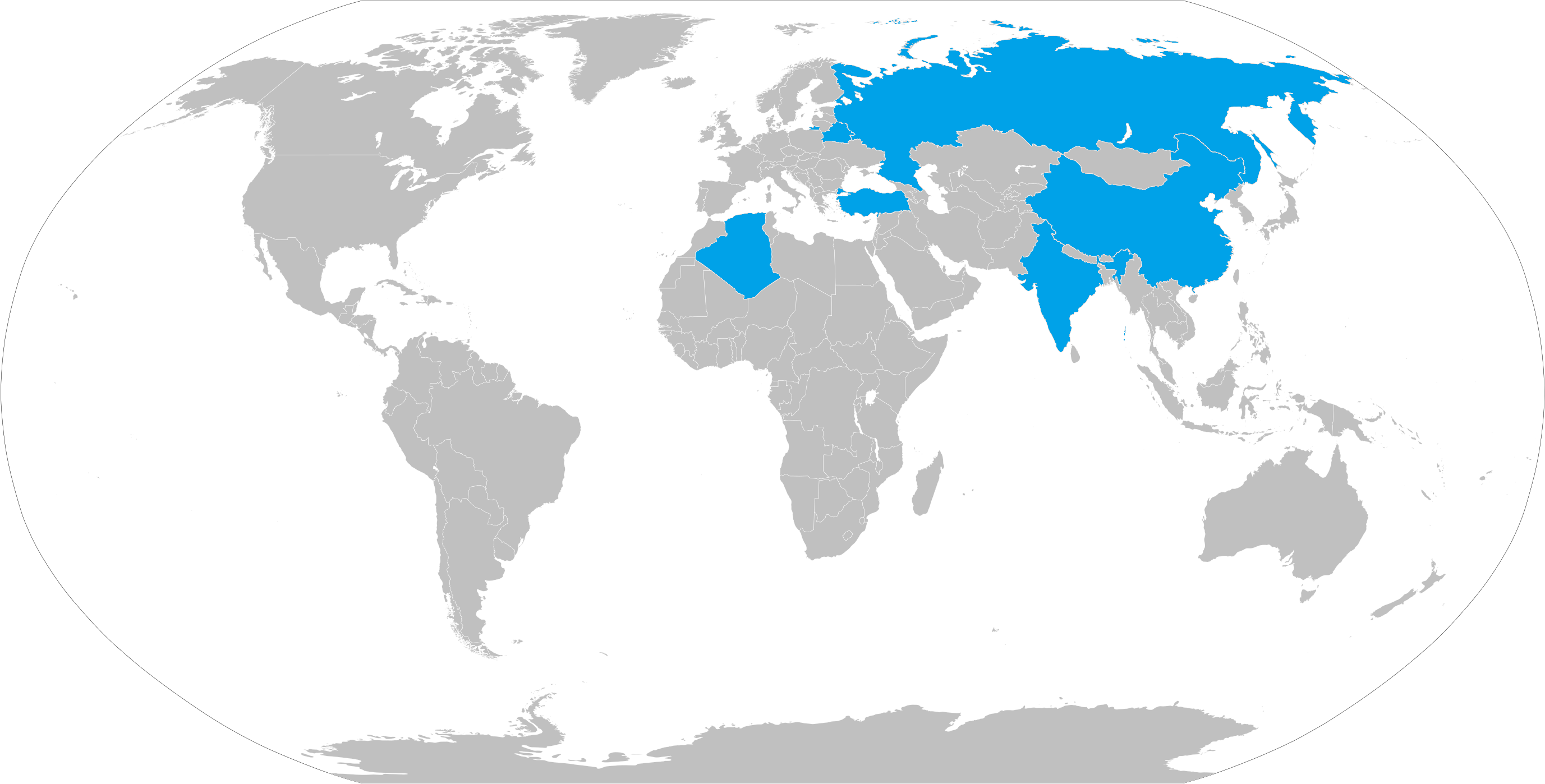
Current operators: Russia, Algeria, Belarus, China, Turkey, India

=== Current operators ===
Algeria

- Algerian Territorial Air Defence Forces – First S-400 units allegedly delivered in September 2021. 2 regiments officially ordered in 2024. First officially operational in late May 2025.

Belarus

- Belarusian Air Force – Contract signed in May 2022 and executed in December.

China

- People's Liberation Army Air Force – Contract signed in September 2014, deliveries of units began in January 2018, and are being introduced.

India

- Indian Air Force – A contract for 5 systems, each arming a squadron, was signed in October 2018 during an official meeting between Russia's president Vladimir Putin and India's prime minister Narendra Modi in New Delhi. 3 squadrons delivered by February 2023. The last two systems are expected for delivery by 2026-end. Five more squadrons to be purchased.

Russia

- Russian Aerospace Forces
  - Western Military District (former)
    - 3 battalions of the 210th Anti-Aircraft Rocket Regiment, Dmitrov
    - 3 battalions of the 606th Anti-Aircraft Rocket Regiment, Elektrostal
    - 2 battalions of the 93rd Anti-Aircraft Rocket Regiment, Zvenigorod
    - 2 battalions of the 549th Anti-Aircraft Rocket Regiment, Podolsk
    - 2 battalions of the 584th Anti-Aircraft Rocket Regiment, Zelenograd
    - 2 battalions of the 500th Anti-Aircraft Rocket Regiment, Gostilitsy
    - 2 battalions of the 1488th Anti-Aircraft Rocket Regiment, Zelenogorsk
    - 2 battalions of the 1544th Anti-Aircraft Rocket Regiment, Luga
    - 2 battalions of the 183rd Anti-Aircraft Rocket Regiment, Kaliningrad
    - 2 battalions of the 1545th Anti-Aircraft Rocket Regiment, Kaliningrad Oblast
  - Eastern Military District
    - 2 battalions of the 589th Anti-Aircraft Rocket Regiment, Nakhodka
    - 3 battalions of the 1532nd Anti-Aircraft Rocket Regiment, Petropavlovsk-Kamchatsky
    - 2 battalions of the 1533th Anti-Aircraft Rocket Regiment, Vladivostok
    - 2 battalions of the 1530th Anti-Aircraft Rocket Regiment, Khabarovsk
    - 2 battalions of the 1724th Anti-Aircraft Rocket Regiment, Yuzhno-Sakhalinsk
  - Southern Military District
    - 2 battalions of the 1537th Anti-Aircraft Rocket Regiment, Novorossiysk
    - 2 battalions of the 18th Anti-Aircraft Rocket Regiment, Feodosia, Crimea
    - 2 battalions of the 12th Anti-Aircraft Rocket Regiment, Sevastopol, Crimea
  - Central Military District
    - 2 battalions of the 511th Anti-Aircraft Rocket Regiment, Engels
    - 1 battalion of the 507th Anti-Aircraft Rocket Regiment, Saratov
    - 2 battalions of the 568th Anti-Aircraft Rocket Regiment, Samara
    - 2 battalions of the 185th Anti-Aircraft Rocket Regiment, Yekaterinburg
  - Northern Military District (former)
    - 2 battalions of the 33th Anti-Aircraft Rocket Regiment, Rogachevo
    - 2 battalions of the 531st Anti-Aircraft Rocket Regiment, Murmansk

Turkey

- Turkish Air Force:
  - Air Defense Command (Hava Savunma Komutanlığı)
    - S-400 Group Command (S400 Grup Komutanlığı) (Akıncı-Ankara)
      - 15th Missile Base Command (15. Füze Üs Komutanlığı) (Alemdağ-Istanbul)
      - 20th Missile Base Command (20. Füze Üs Komutanlığı) (Birecik-Şanlıurfa)
      - Possible future base in Anamur-Mersin

== Gallery ==
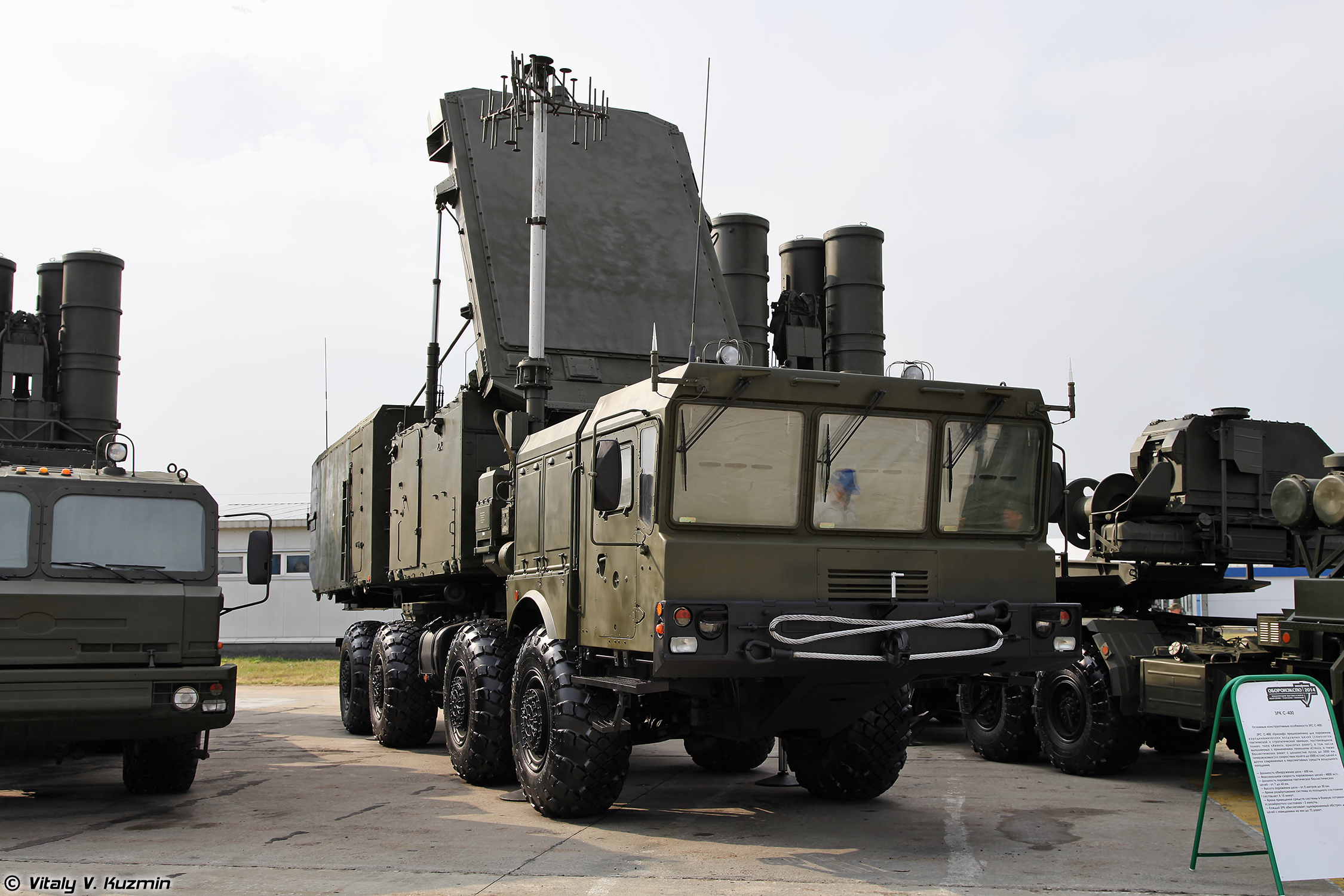
S-400's 92N2 radar and 5P85T2

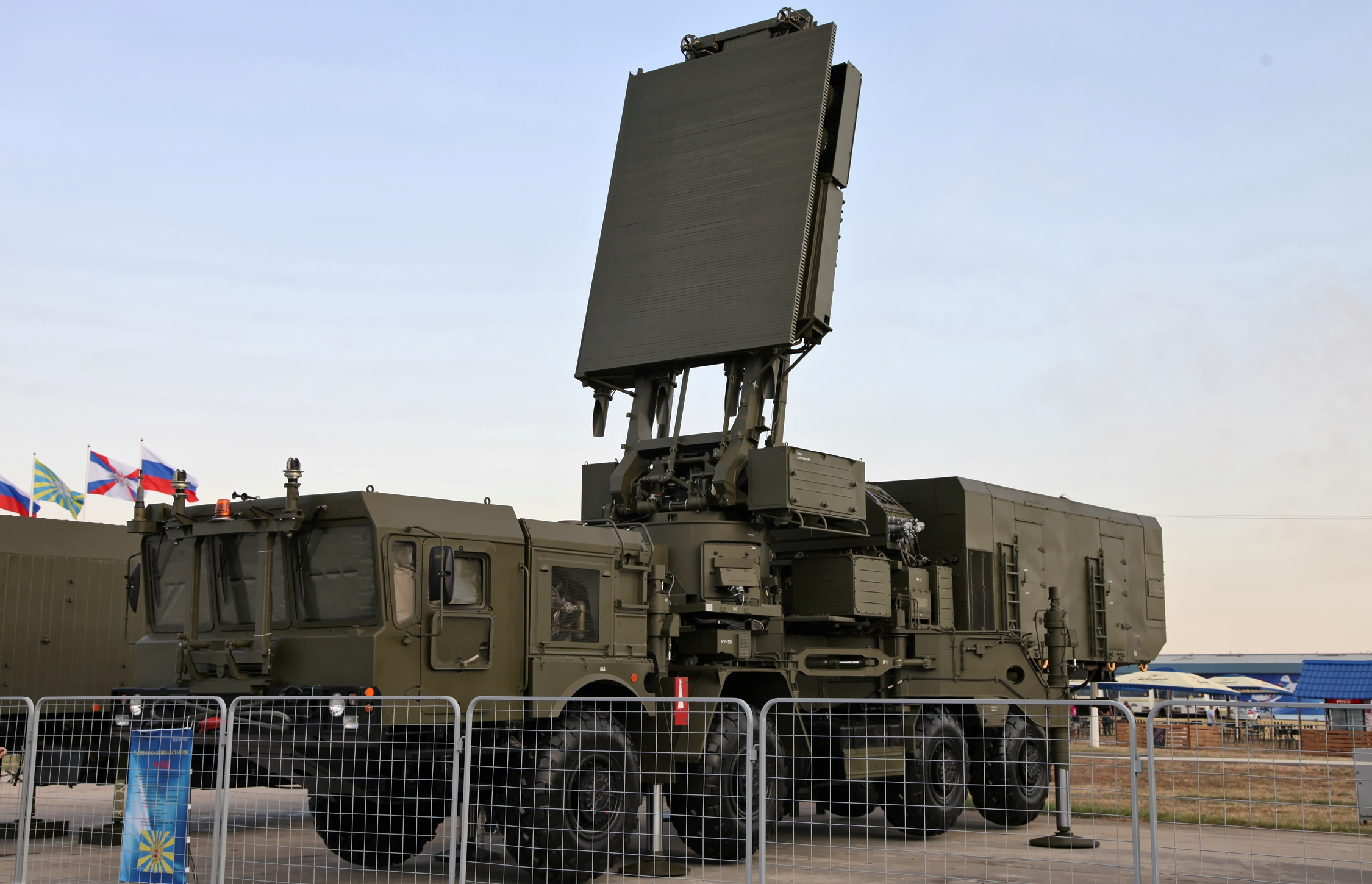
The 96L6 high-altitude detector

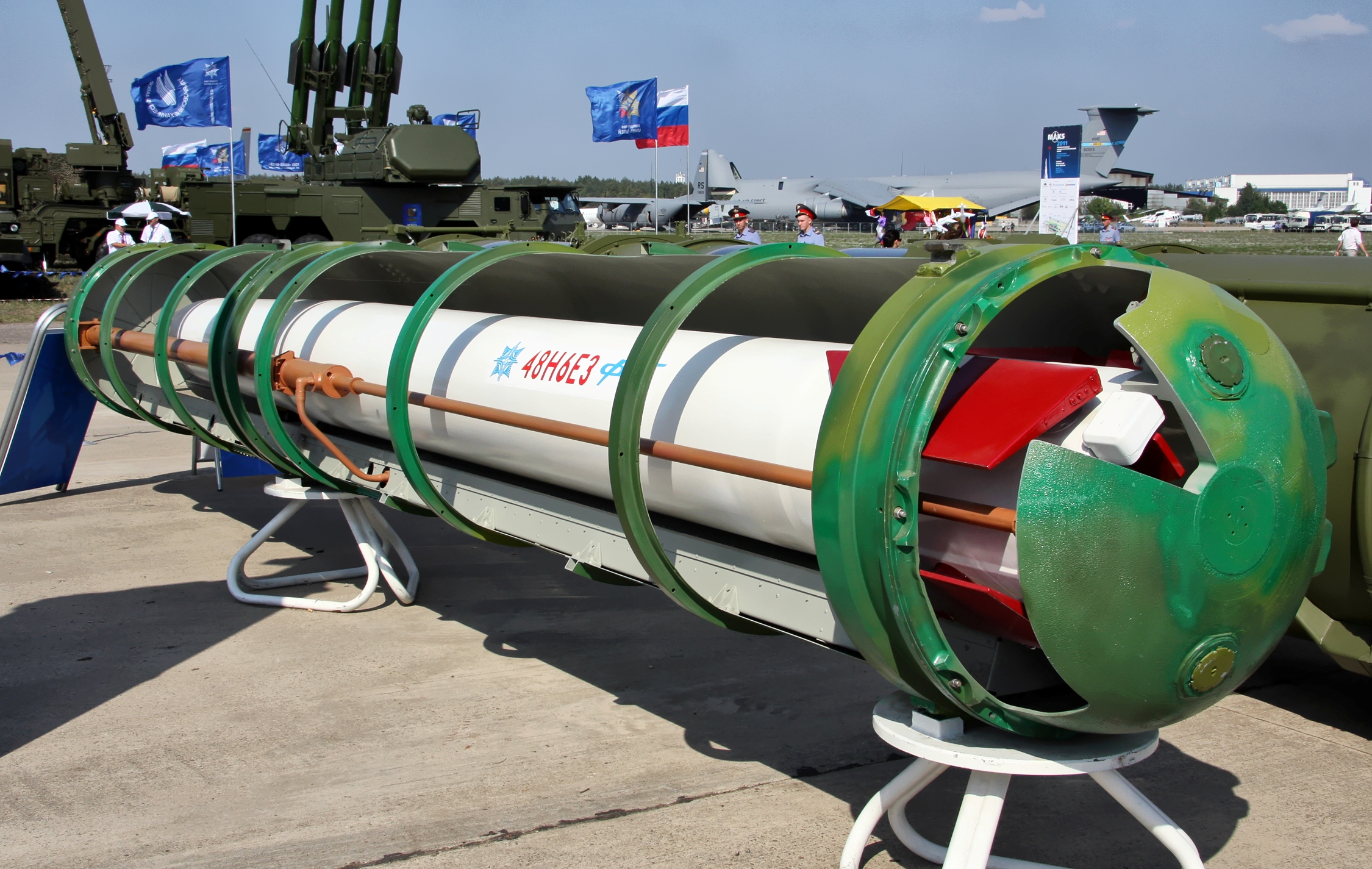
The 48N6E3 missile used by the S-400

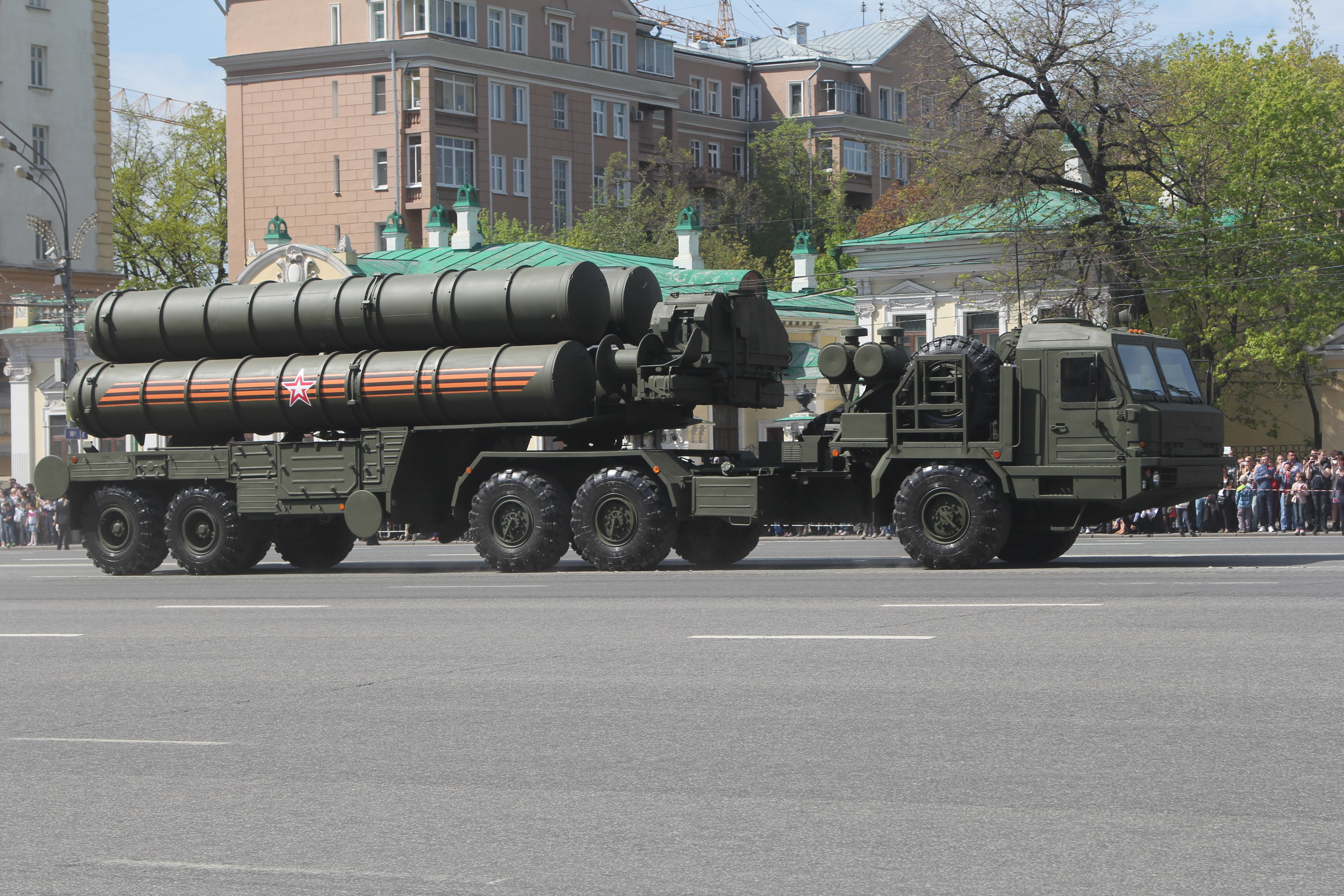
S-400 Triumf launch vehicle

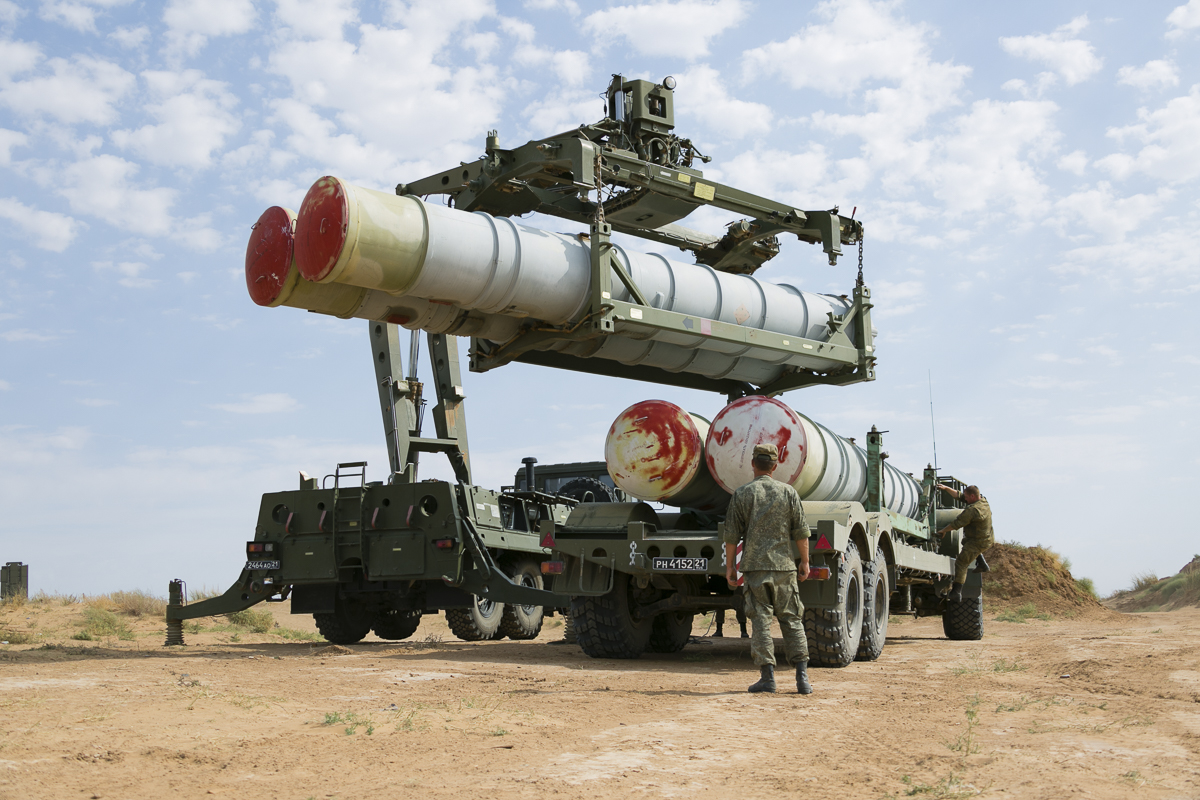
22T6 loader for S-400 and S-300 systems

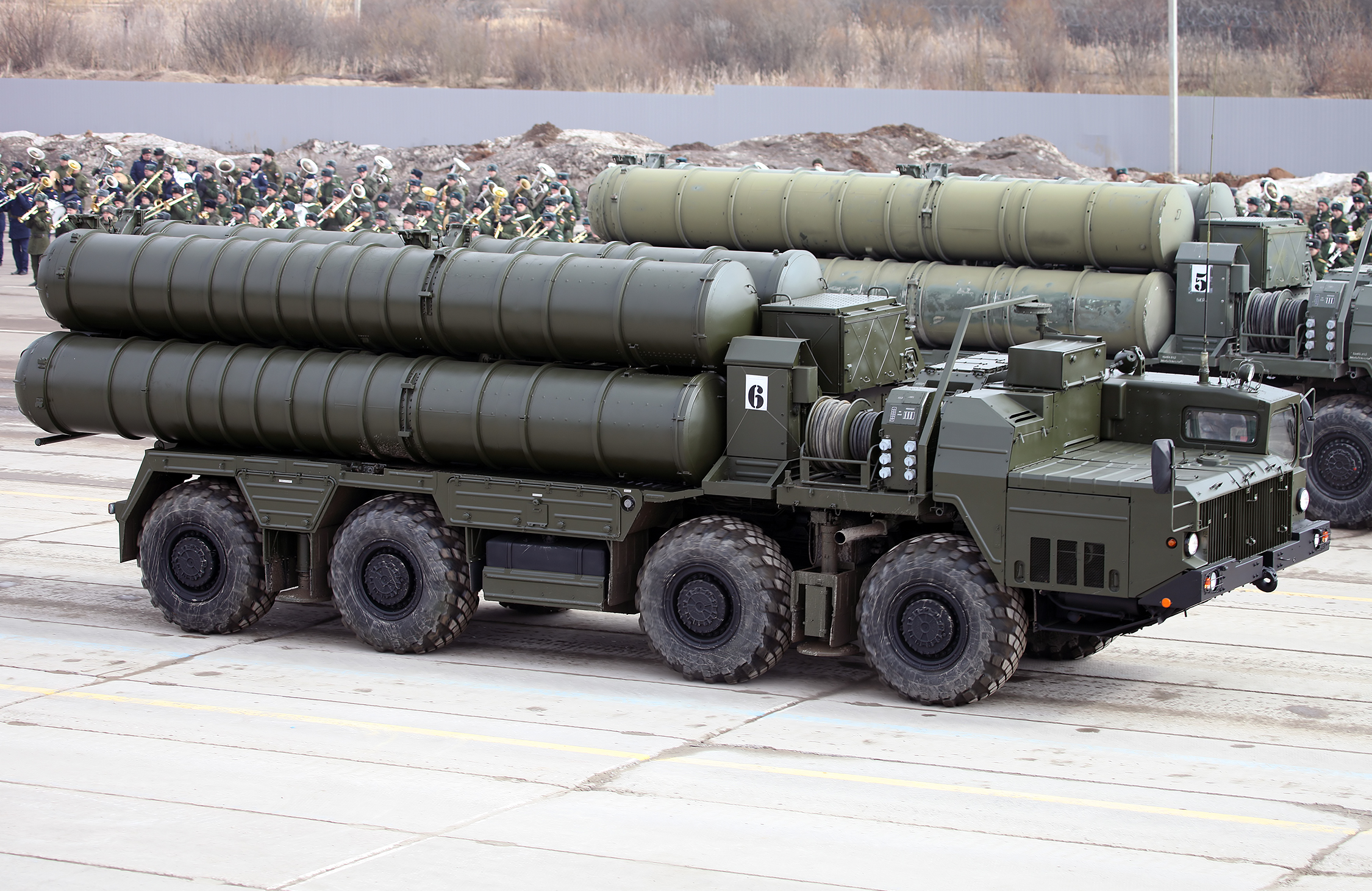
5P85SM2-01 TEL launcher from the S-400 system

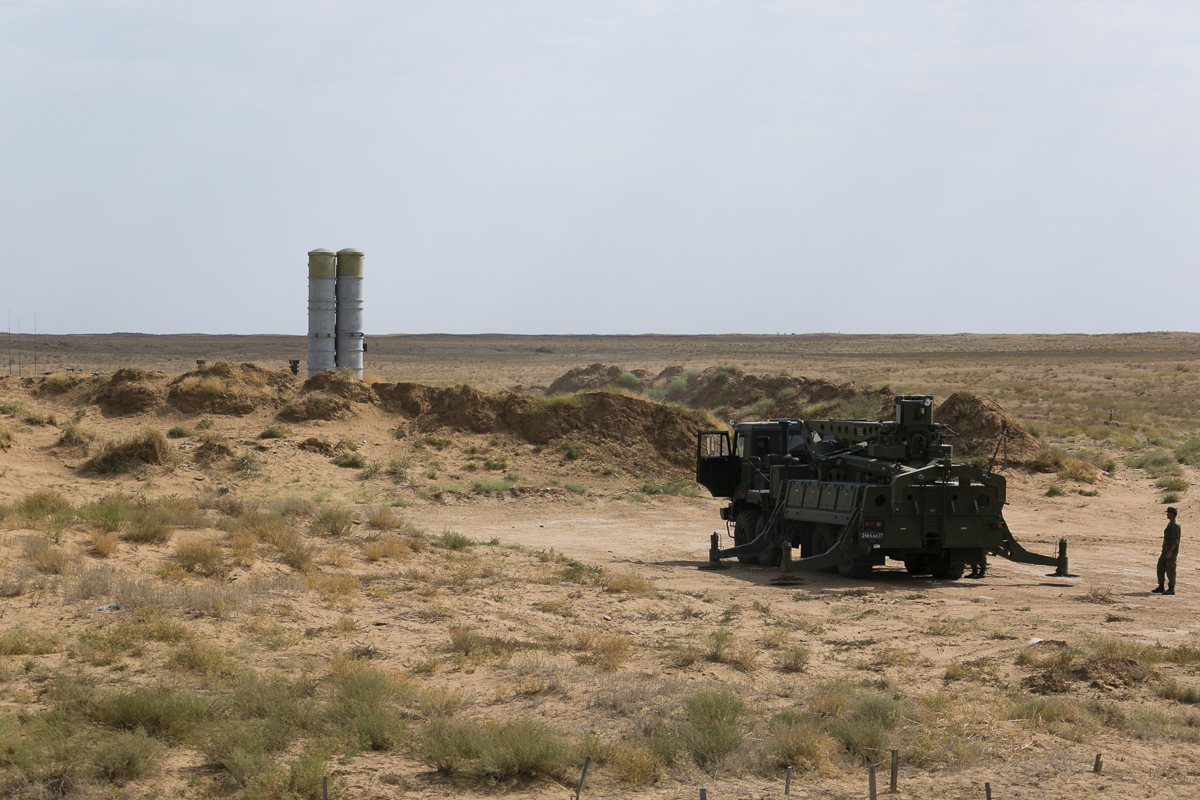
ТЗМ 22Т6 on the Ashuluk proving ground in 2017

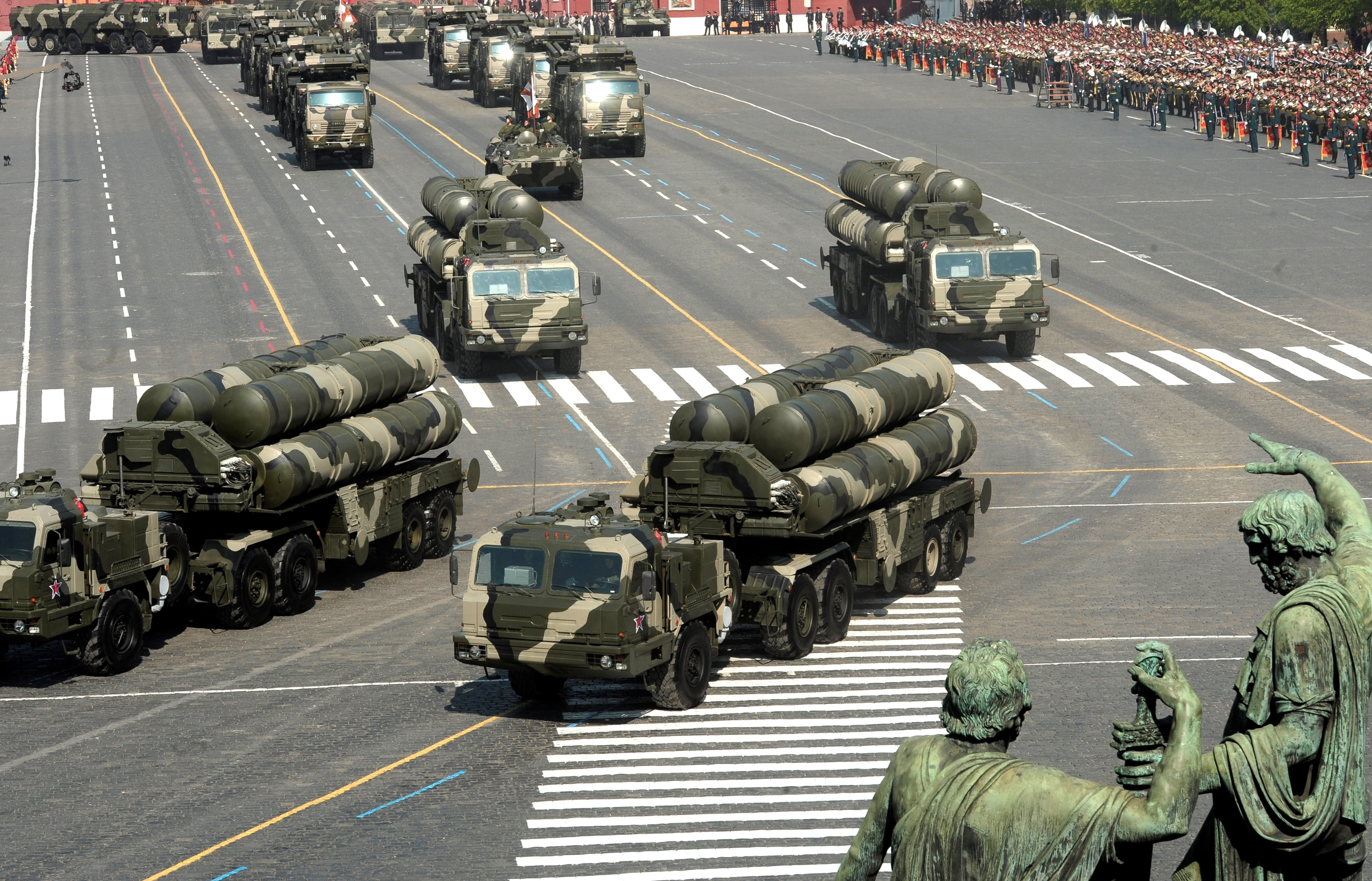
S-400 surface-to-air missile systems during the Victory parade 2010

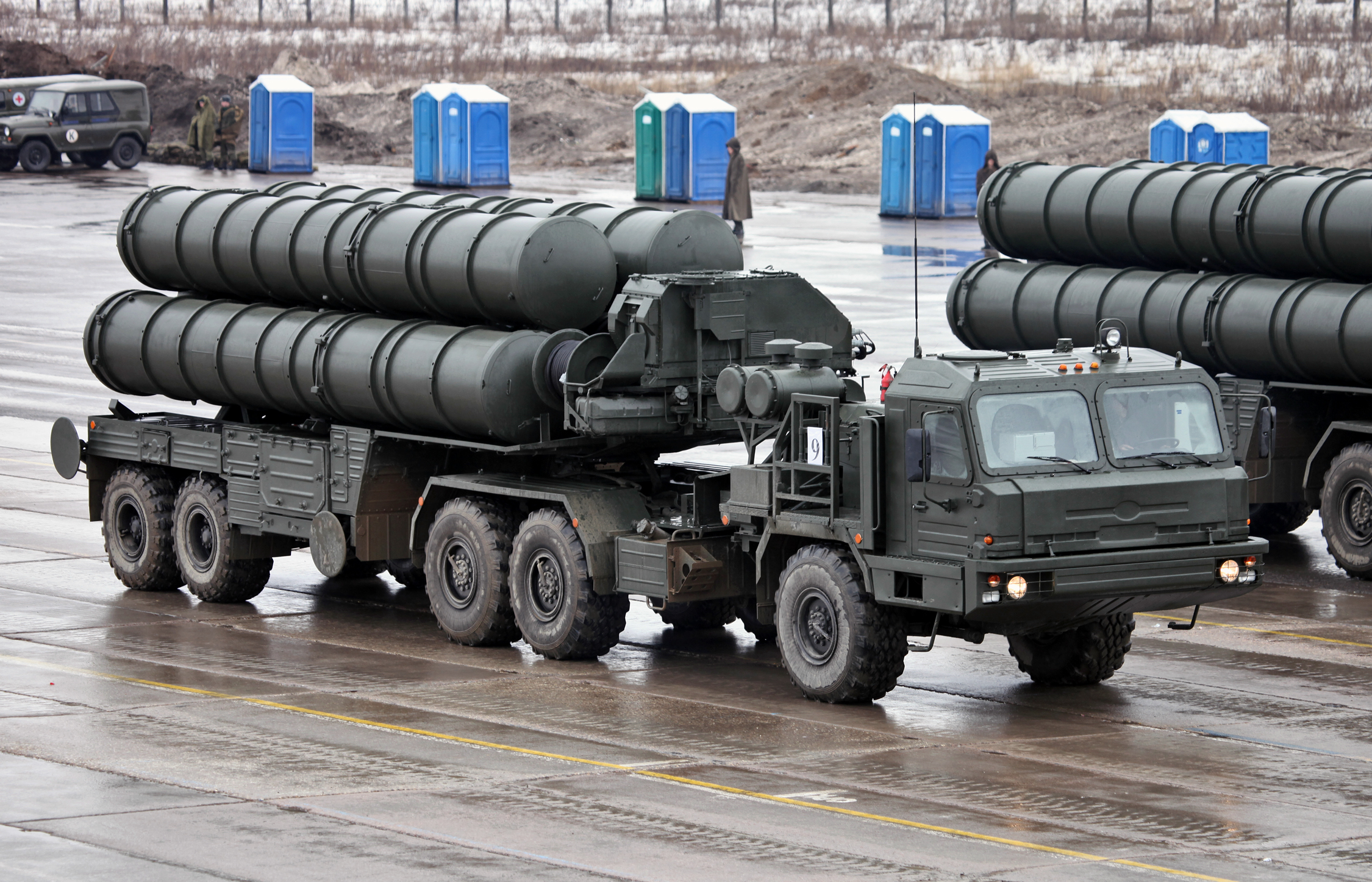

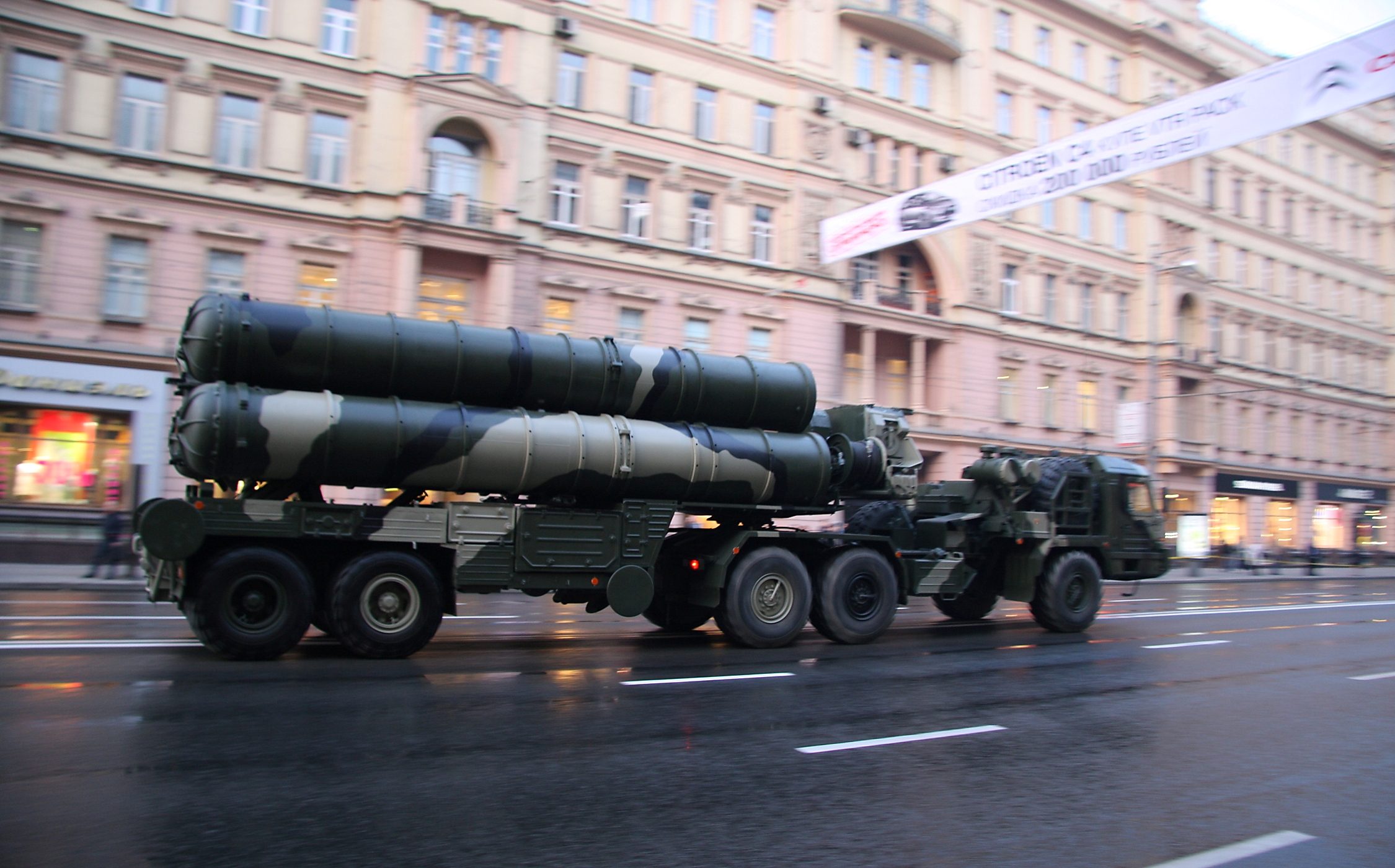
S-400 system during a rehearsal for Russia's 2009 Victory Day parade in Moscow

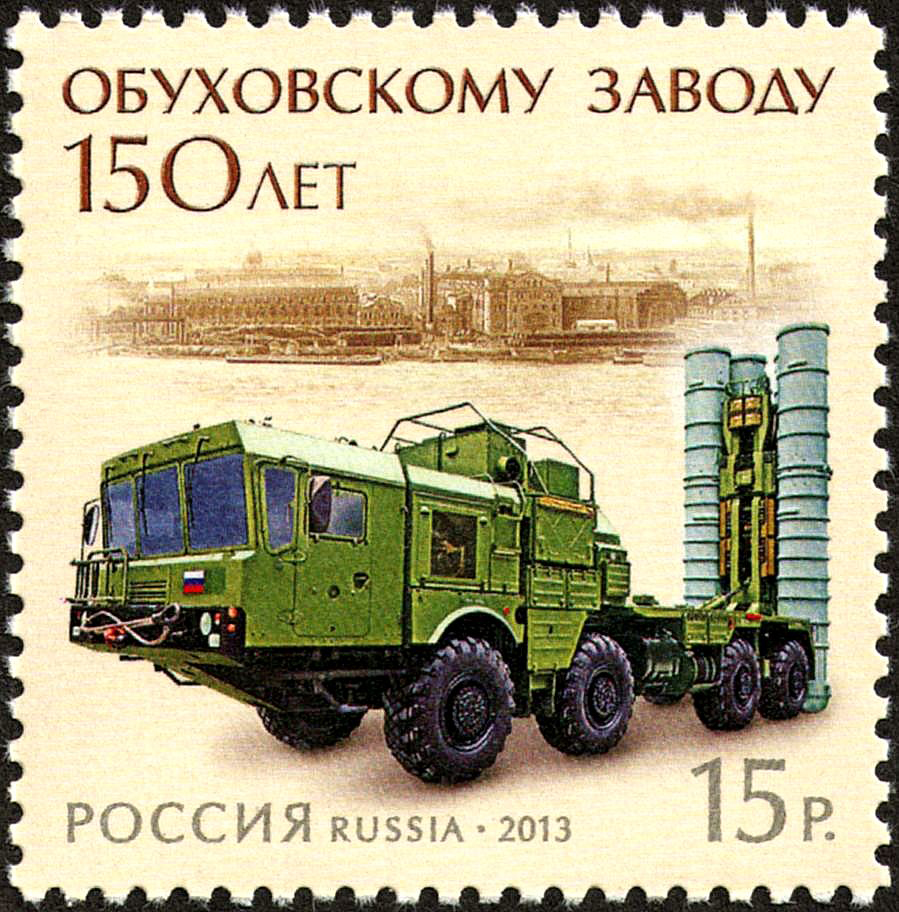
Russian 15.00 rubles stamp commemorating the 150th anniversary of the Obukhov State Plant

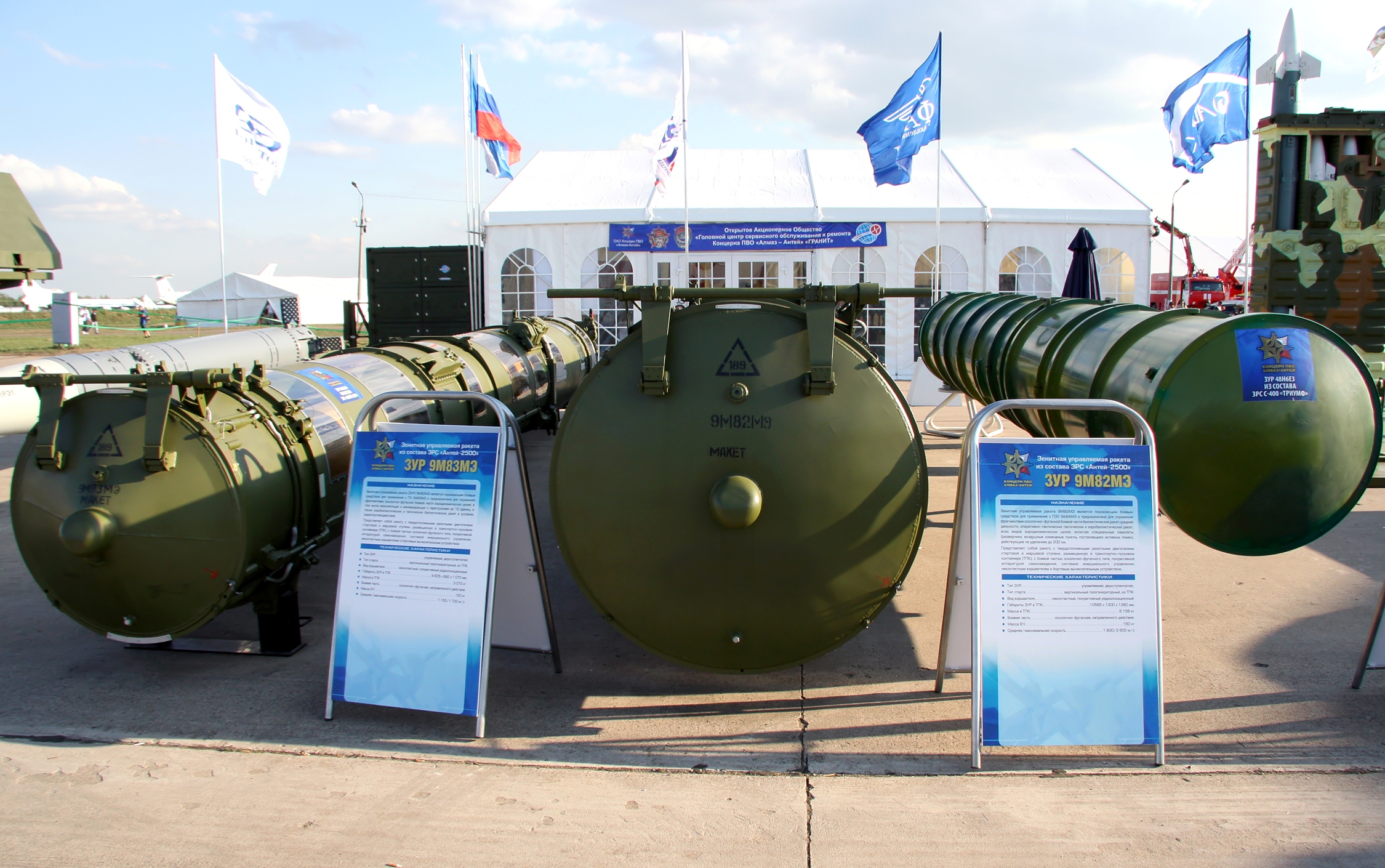
9M83ME and 9M82ME SAM for S-300VM Antey-2500 missile system and 48N6E3 SAM for S-400 system

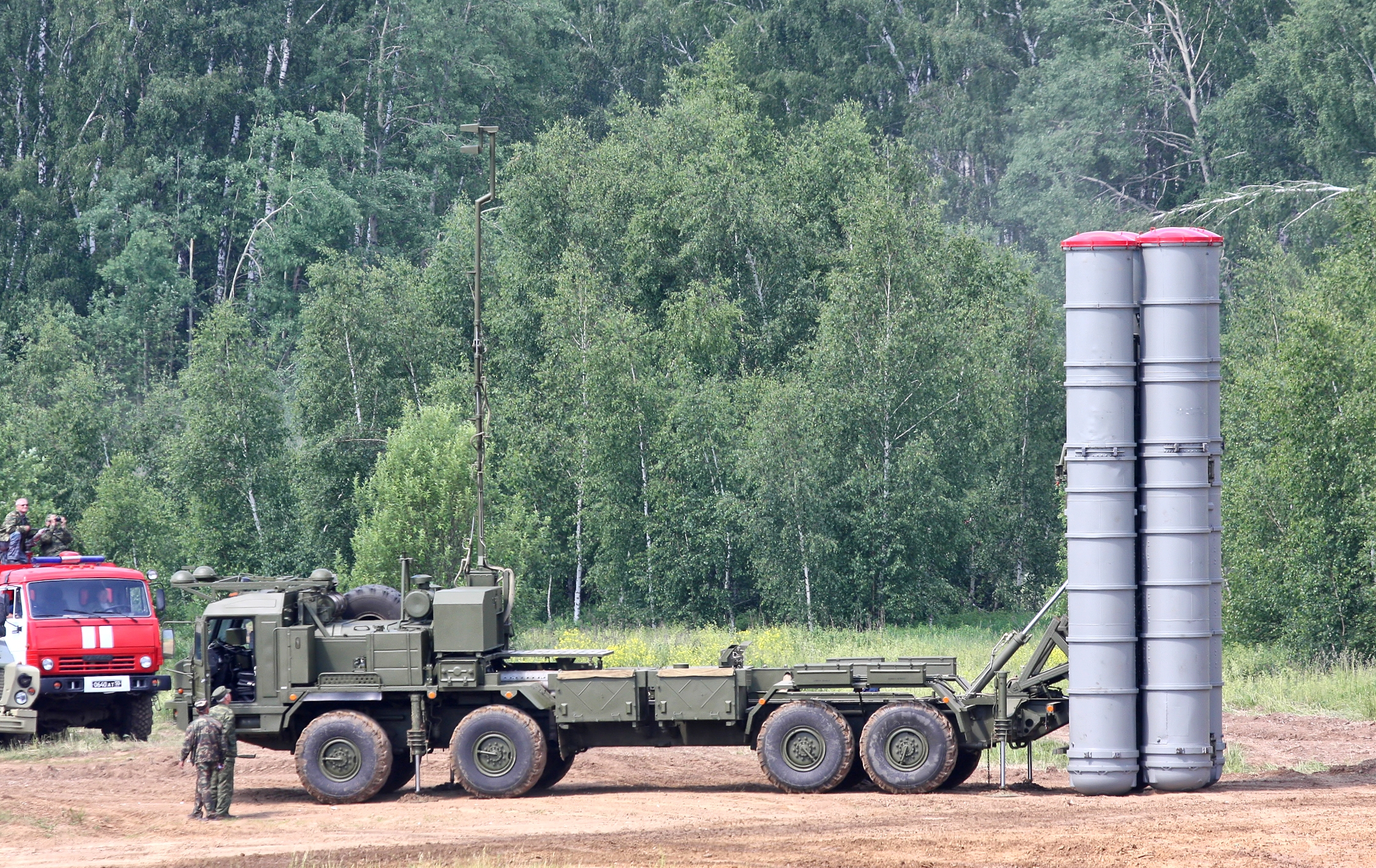
The self-propelled launch vehicle 5P90S on a BAZ-6909-022 chassis for the S-400 system

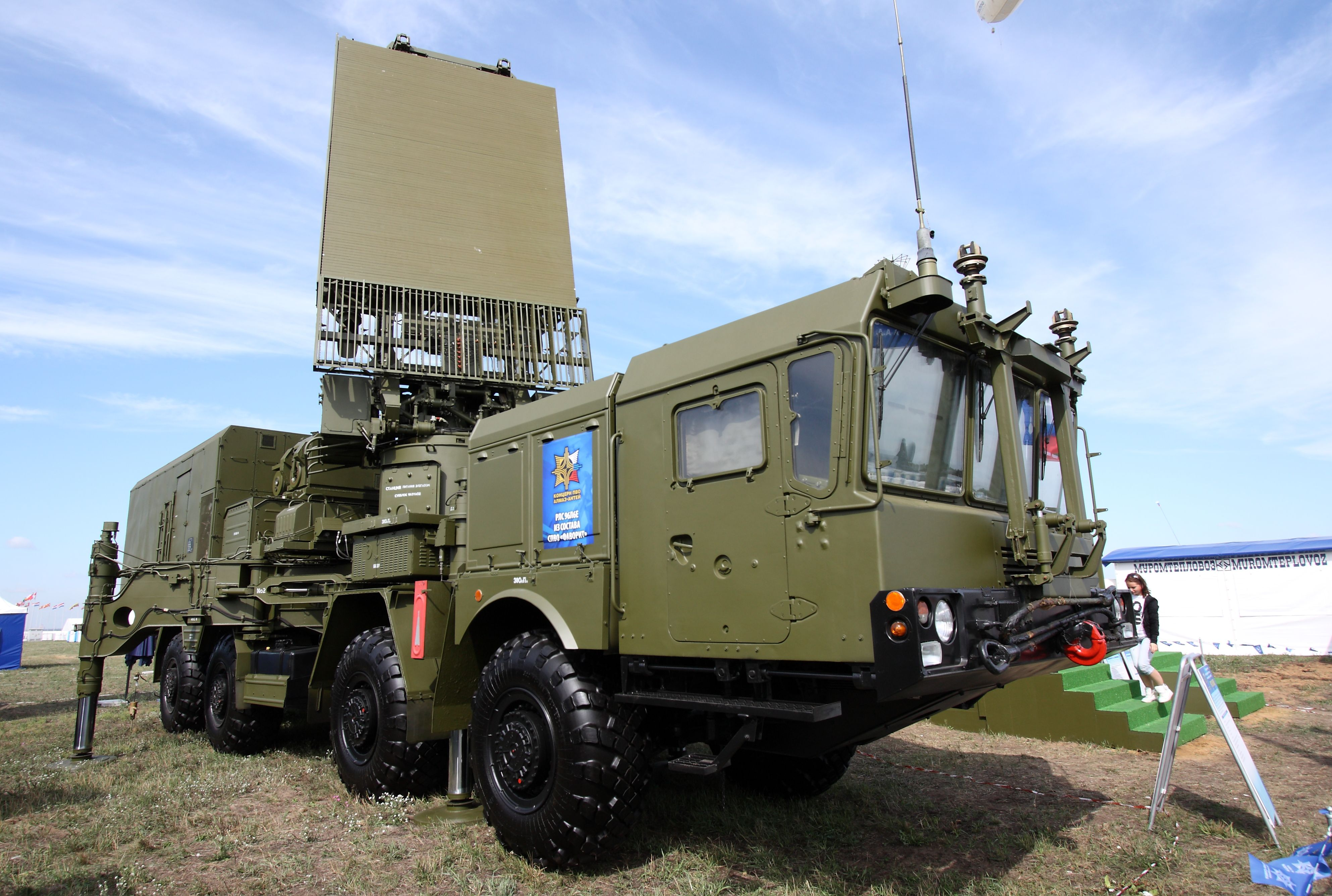
The all-altitude detection radar 96L6E of S-300/400 systems, mounted on the chassis of MZKT-7930

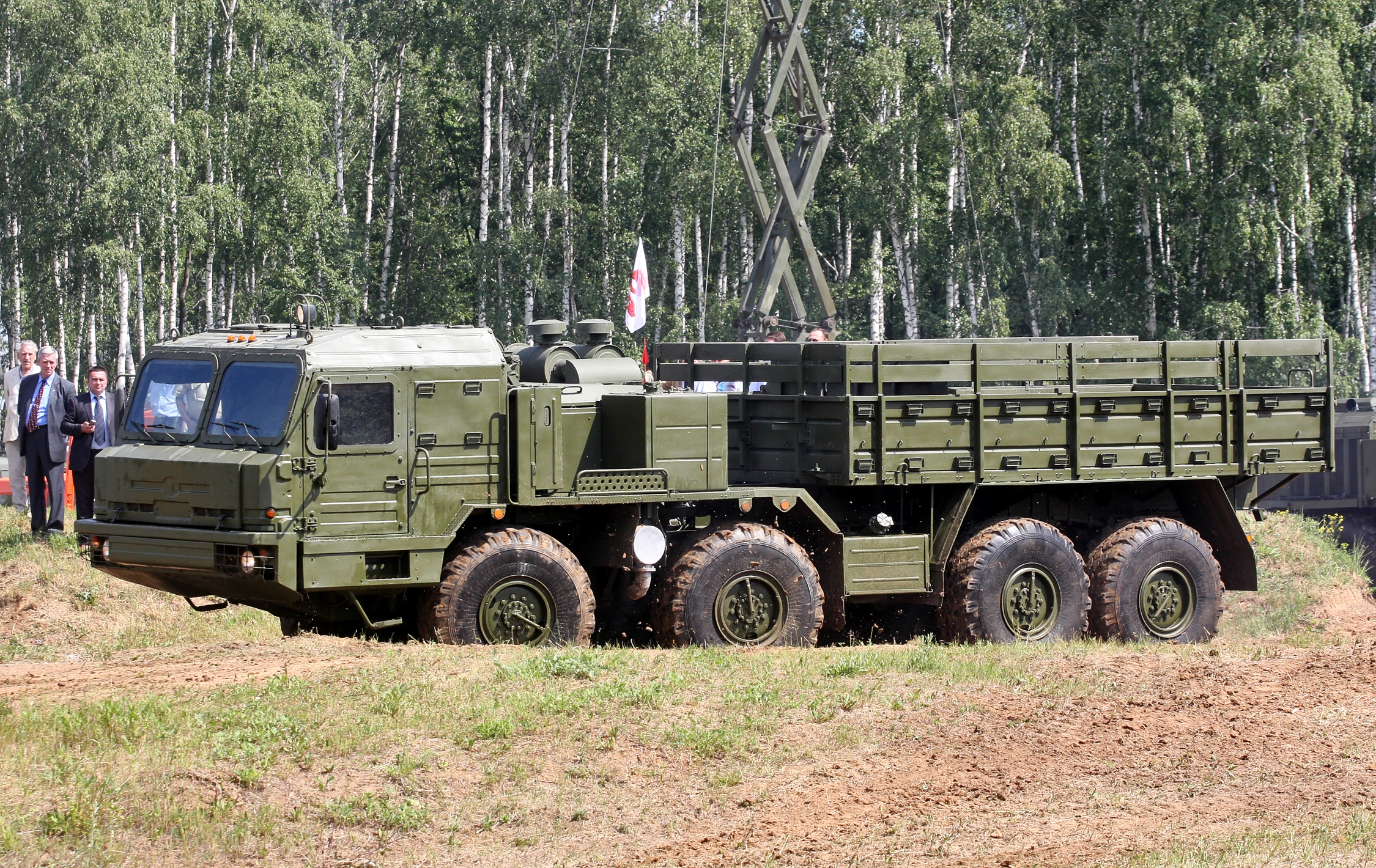
The BAZ-69092-021 towing vehicle for the 5I57A power generator and the 63T6A power converter for the S-400 system

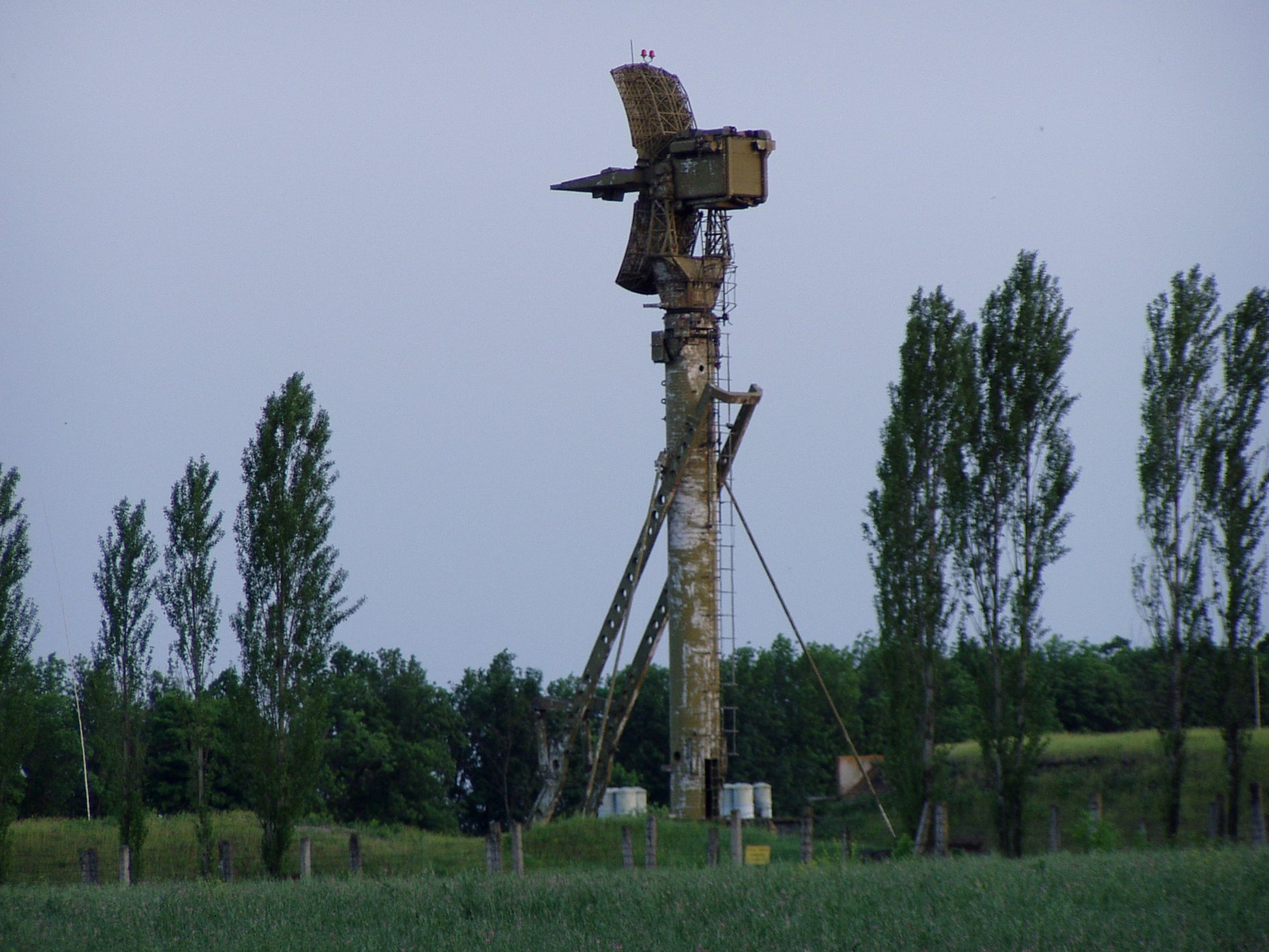
76N6 Clam Shell FMCW acquisition radar is used to support the Flap Lid SA-10 fire control radar. NATO code name: "Clam Shell."

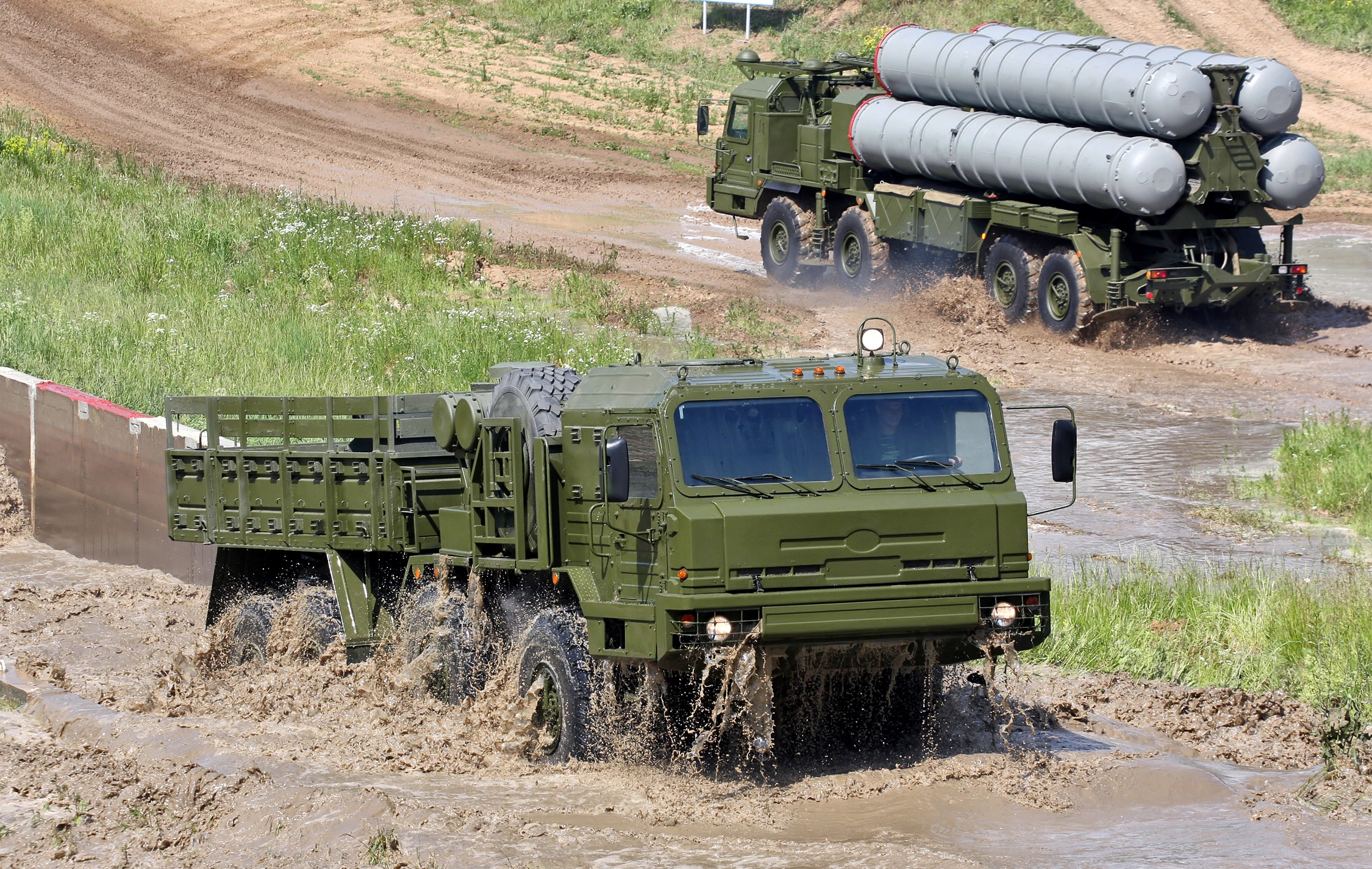
The BAZ-69092-021 towing vehicle for the 5I57A power generator and the 63T6A power converter for the S-400 system

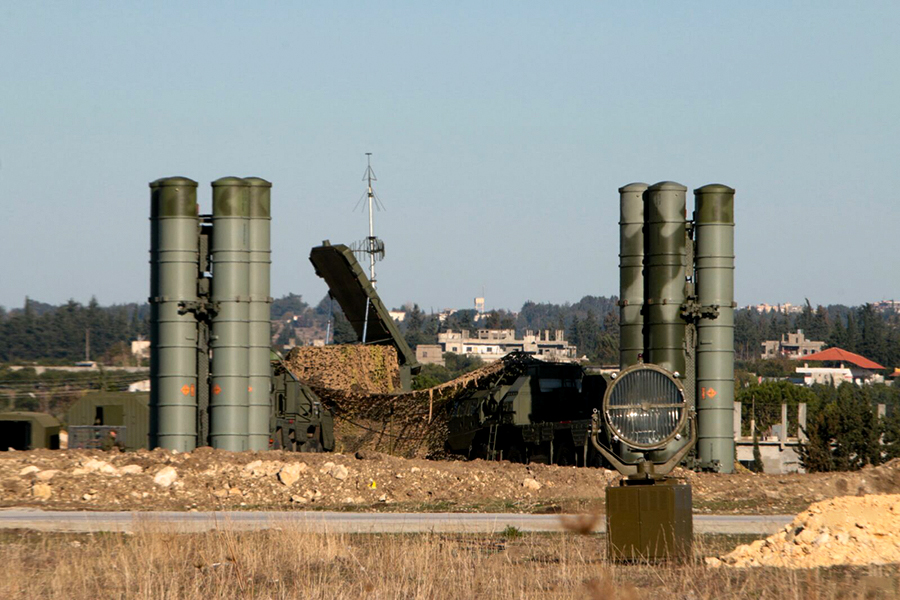
Two 5P85SM surface-to-air missile launchers and a 92Н6 radar guidance at Russia's Khmeimim airbase in Syria

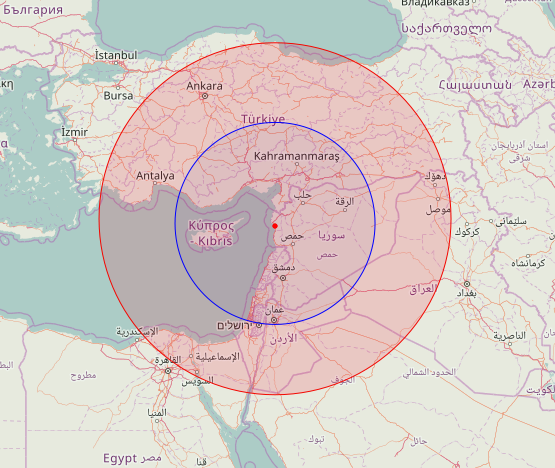
Anti-access/area denial bubble created by Iskander-M and S-400 systems deployed at Russia's Khmeimim airbase in Syria. Red – ballistic missile range (700 km). Blue – maximum range of the S-400 system with 40N6 missile (400 km).

== See also ==
- List of surface-to-air missiles
- S-300 missile system
- S-300VM missile system
- S-350 missile system
- S-500 missile system
- KM-SAM
- L-SAM
- Medium Extended Air Defense System
- THAAD
- MIM-104 Patriot
- Comparison of anti-ballistic missile systems
- Missile defence systems by country
