= Viktor Ivanov =

Russian politician and businessman

- Виктор Петрович Иванов
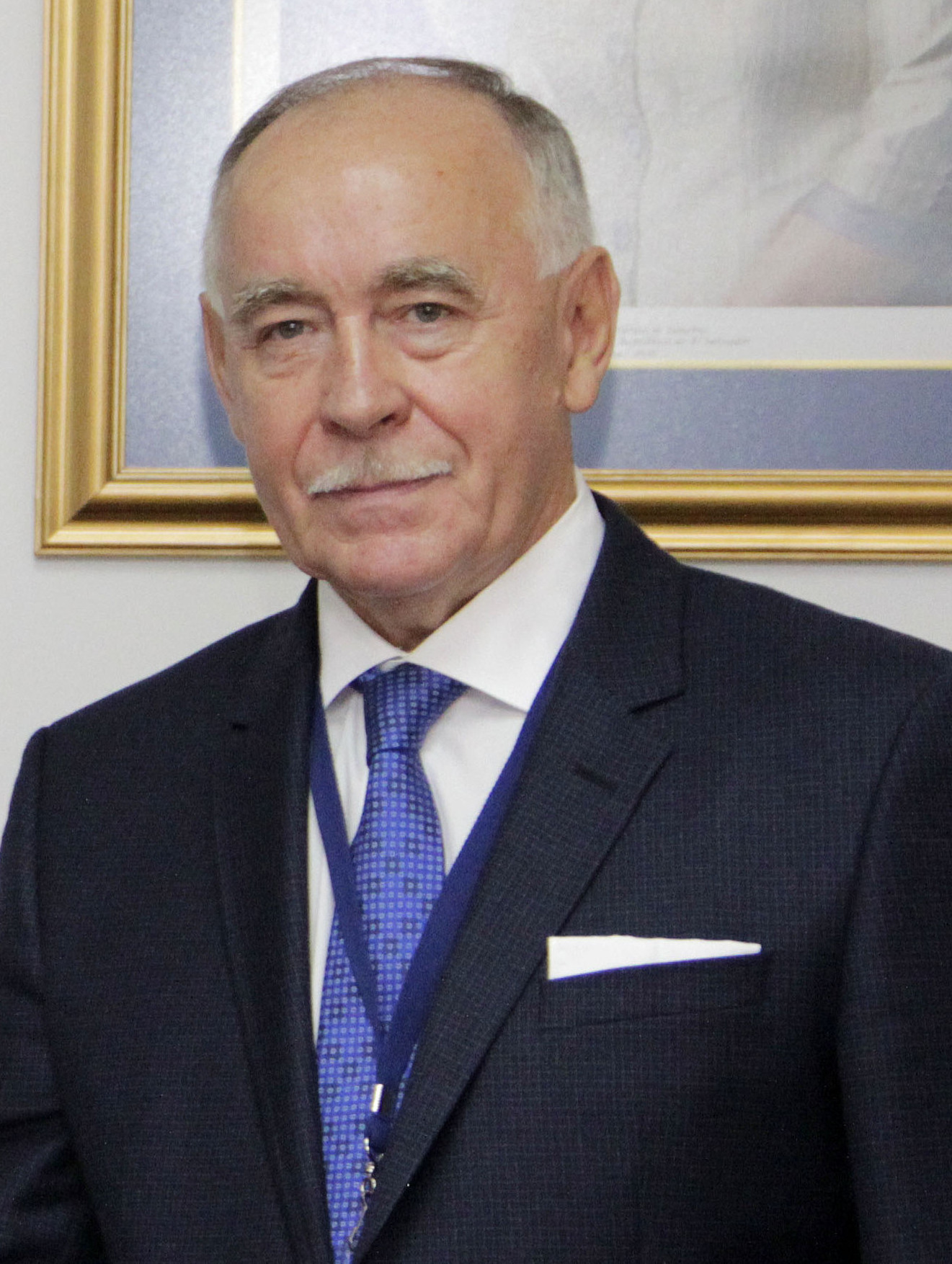
- Ivanov in 2015
- Born: May 12, 1950 (age 76); Novgorod, Russian SFSR, Soviet Union
- Military career
- Allegiance: Soviet Union (1977-1991); Russia (1991-2016)
- Branch: KGB (1977-1991); Federal Counterintelligence Service (1991-1994); Federal Security Service (1998-2000); Federal Drug Control Service (2008-2016)
- Service years: 1971–2016
- Rank: 1st class Active State Councillor of the Russian Federation
- Conflicts: Soviet–Afghan War

Viktor Petrovich Ivanov (Russian: Виктор Петрович Иванов, born May 12, 1950) is a Russian politician, businessman and former KGB officer, who served in the KGB Directorate of Leningrad and its successors in 1977–1994. He was the director of the Federal Drug Control Service of Russia from 2008 until 2016.

He has the federal state civilian service rank of 1st class Active State Councillor of the Russian Federation.

== Early life ==
Ivanov graduated from Leningrad Electrotechnical Institute of Communications under Konstantin Muravyov in 1971. From 1971 to 1977 as an engineer in the army, he worked at Leningrad's research institute Vector (Russian: НПО "Вектор") which conducted research and development of mobile and portable microwave communications monitoring and direction finding devices using micro-assemblies and microcircuits.

== Career ==
In 1987–1988 as a KGB officer he took part in the Soviet–Afghan War.

In December 1990 together with Boris Gryzlov and Valentin Chuykin he founded the small-scale enterprise Blok engaged in various businesses and became its director.

He has strong links to the Tambov Russian mafia. He supported Vladimir Kumarin's Tambovskaya OGG in their war against the Malyshevskaya OGG for control of the Saint Petersburg sea port and the trafficking of Colombian narcotics through the Saint Petersburg sea port to Europe. (Note: As of 2017, Tamboskaya OGG also controlled the Stockholm sea port.) (Note: Russia is the largest consumer of heroin per capita in the world.)

In October 1994 he resigned from FSK and, upon Vladimir Putin's recommendation to Mayor Anatoly Sobchak, was appointed Chief of the Administrative Staff of the Saint Petersburg Mayor Office until Sobchak lost the election in 1996.

Ivanov headed the Russian-United States firm Teleplus CJSC also spelled Tele+ or Teleplyus (Russian: ЗАО "Телеплюс") in 1996 and served as its CEO until 1998. "Teleplus" CJSC is a United States-Russia company which was engaged in broadcasting and installation of transmitters and receivers for both satellite and terrestrial communications. It had 30 channels including CNN and Euronews. Telcell, which was a subsidiary of the John Kluge's Metromedia and later formed in 1984 in Mexico City and owned by Carlos Slim's América Móvil, had a 45% stake in Teleplus. (Note: Metromedia helped Rupert Murdoch's News Corp form Murdock's Fox Broadcasting Company on 9 October 1986 and later Fox News. Previously in 1985, Murdoch had purchased 20th Century Fox from Marvin Davis who purchased his partner Marc Rich's stake in 20th Century Fox in 1984. John Kluge's Metromedia's subsidiary «Telcel», which was founded in 1984 in Mexico City and is owned by Carlos Slim's América Móvil, was very active in the Soviet Union and eastern Europe before 2003.)

In 1999 he succeeded Nikolai Patrushev as the head of the Internal Security Department of Russia's FSB. As of 2007, he had been a Deputy Head of the Presidential Staff for personnel appointed by Vladimir Putin since January 5, 2000. Viktor Ivanov is considered one of Putin's closest allies. (Note: Other siloviki close to Ivanov include Nikolai Patrushev, Alexander Bortnikov, and Igor Sechin.)

In September 2001 Russia's prime minister appointed Ivanov representative of the state in the boards of directors of the Antei Corporation and Almaz Scientific Industrial Corporation, developing and producing air defence systems, including S-300. On November 22, 2001, he was elected chairman of the board of directors of Almaz and initiated the merger of Almaz and Antei. Since June 2002 Ivanov has been the chairman of the board of directors of the result of the merger, OJSC Almaz-Antei Air Defense Concern.

Since November 4, 2004, he has also been the chairman of the board of directors of JSC Aeroflot airline.

== Head of the Federal Drug Control Service of Russia ==
Since May 15, 2008, he has been a director of Russia's Federal Drug Control Service of Russia and a chairman of State Anti-Narcotics Committee, which includes 29 heads of Russian ministries.

In 2010, when the State of California in the United States had a ballot initiative asking voters about the legalization of marijuana, Ivanov public spoke out against it. He flew to Los Angeles and Washington, D.C., to lobby against drug legalization, meeting with the Los Angeles mayor, Los Angeles county sheriff, and U.S. drug czar.

In 2010, Rinat Akhmetshin penned an op-ed article for the Washington Times which was very supportive of Ivanov and his anti narcotics efforts.

== Sanctions ==
On March 20, 2014, the US Office of Foreign Assets Control (OFAC) published that Victor Ivanov and 19 other men had been added to the Specially Designated Nationals List.

== Personal ==
Ivanov is married and has a daughter and a son.
