= MAK Vympel =

Russian company specializing in missile and space defence systems

- Native name: МАК Вымпел
- Type: Public
- Industry: Missile and space defense
- Founded: 1961 - as KB OKB Vympel; 1966 - as NPO Vympel; 1970 - as TsNPO Vympel; 1992 - as OJSC "MAK "Vympel"
- Headquarters: Geroyev Panfilovtsev St., 10, bldg 1, Moscow, Russia
- Key people: Igor Makushev (CEO)
- Number of employees: 3500 (2012)
- Parent: Almaz-Antey
- Website: macvympel.ru

Public Joint Stock Company "Vympel" Interstate Corporation (abbreviated as JSC MAK Vympel) is the parent enterprise of the interstate joint-stock corporation of a number of Russian and Belarusian scientific and production enterprises.

The main activity of the company is the creation and coordinated development of missile and space defense systems as an integral part of the Aerospace Forces of the Russian Federation.

== History ==
The history of the enterprise begins with the formation of Special Bureau No. 1 (since 1950 - KB-1) by the Resolution of the Council of Ministers of the USSR. In 1955, Department No. 31 on missile defense issues was organized as a part of KB-1, from which Special Design Bureau No. 30 (SKB-30) was formed. In 1961, the Vympel Design Bureau was separated into a separate KB OKB Vympel, and since 1966, NPO Vympel.

In 1968, STC (Scientific and Technical Center) under the leadership of Anatoly Basistov and NIIRP (Scientific Research Institute of Radio Instrument Making) were created within the enterprise.

In order to create a missile and space defense system, including an anti-ballistic missile defense system, a missile attack warning system, a Space domain awareness and an anti-space defense, by order of the USSR Ministry of Radio Industry dated January 15, 1970, No. 25, the Central Scientific and Production Association (TsNPO) Vympel was created on the basis of the Scientific and Technical Center, which was separated from the Vympel Design Bureau as the lead organization for the systems mentioned above. This was the first TsNPO in the country. Subsequently, this form of organizing the work of science and industry became widespread and became the main one in the USSR.

The enterprise brought together the country's best scientific, design, and production teams. The Vympel Scientific Production Association (TsNPO) included the Vympel Design Bureau, RTI, NIIDAR, NIVK, the Raspletin Design Bureau, the Systems Programming Design Bureau, one of the country's largest radio plants— the Dneprovsky Machine-Building Plant, the Gomel Radio Plant, and the NIIDAR pilot plant. Several other enterprises were subsequently formed within it.

More than 150 leading organizations and enterprises alone were involved in the work on the missile and space defense topic, whose activities were centrally directed by Vympel. In total, the cooperation comprised more than 600 enterprises and organizations from the defense sectors of science and industry.

Soon after the collapse of the USSR, the threat of a decline in the combat effectiveness and performance of missile defense systems arose, as many of the systems' communications and control facilities ended up on the lands of independent states that had emerged from the USSR. As a result, many scientific, production, and information links between industrial enterprises and institutions and the Armed Forces were also disrupted.

=== OAO MAK "Vympel" ===
On July 28, 1992, the Open Joint-Stock Company "MAK "Vympel" (OJSC "MAK "Vympel") was established. In accordance with the decision of the Governments of the Russian Federation and the Republic of Belarus dated January 28, 1992, No. 3 and from the moment of state registration, the Company became the legal successor of the rights and obligations of the state enterprise "TsNPO "Vympel". The Company was registered by the Moscow Registration Chamber in the register under No. 017.041 dated September 29, 1992. An entry was made in the Unified State Register of Legal Entities about the Company under the primary state number 1027700341855 on October 22, 2002.

The following institutions then became part of JSC MAK Vympel:

- OJSC MAK Vympel, Moscow
- State Enterprise "Research Institute of Radio Instrumentation (NIIRP)
- JSC Scientific and Production Complex "Research Institute of Long-Range Radio Communications" (NPK NIIDAR)
- JSC "Radiotechnical Institute named after Academician A. L. Mintz" (Mints Radiotechnical Institute)
- JSC "Kirov Instrument-Making Plant"
- OJSC "Micrometer Plant", Kotelnich
- JSC "Scientific and Production Enterprise "Pyramid", St. Petersburg
- Gomel Radio Plant (GRZ), Gomel, Republic of Belarus
- Design Bureau of System Programming (KB SP), Gomel, Republic of Belarus
- Design Bureau "Luch", Gomel, Republic of Belarus
- Dneprovsky Machine-Building Plant (DMZ) and DMZ Design Bureau (DB "Dneprovskoe"), Dnepropetrovsk, Ukraine
- Southern Radio Plant and Design Bureau, Zhovti Vody, Ukraine

Since 2002 it has been part of the Almaz-Antey concern.

Since 2015, OJSC "MAK Vympel" has been transformed into PJSC "MAK Vympel".

== Sanctions ==
On February 23, 2024, the company was included in the sanctions list of the European Union countries as an enterprise developing anti-missile systems and space control systems in service with the Armed Forces of the Russian Federation. For similar reasons, PJSC MAK Vympel is under sanctions by the USA, Canada, Ukraine, Switzerland, Australia and New Zealand.

== Leadership ==
- Vladimir Ivanovich Markov (1921-2019) - the first director of the Vympel Central Scientific Production Association in 1970-1976
- Yuri Nikolaevich Aksyonov - General Director of the Central Research and Production Association "Vympel" in 1976-1987
- Nikolai Vasilievich Mikhailov (b. 1937) - General Director of the Central Research and Production Association (from 1992 - OJSC MAK) "Vympel" from 1987 to 1996
- Vladimir Vasilievich Litvinov (b. 1936) - President of OJSC MAK Vympel in 1996-2005
- Vyacheslav Filippovich Fateev (b. 1948) - President of JSC "MAK "Vympel" from August 2005 to April 2011
- Alexander Viktorovich Lyukhin (b. 1952) - President of JSC "MAK "Vympel" from April 2011 to September 2018
- Sergey Fedotovich Boev (b. 1953) - General Director of PJSC "MAK "Vympel" from September 2018 to November 2022
- Igor Yuryevich Makushev (b. 1964) - General Director of PJSC "MAK "Vympel" since November 24, 2022
