= NIIIP =

Research institute of Measurement

Coordinates: 55°03′22″N 82°57′23″E

NPO NIIIP-NZiK
- Type: Joint stock company
- Industry: radiotechnics
- Founded: 1911
- Headquarters: Novosibirsk, Russia
- Products: Radars and Phased Array Radars, IFF systems
- Parent: Almaz-Antey
- Website: нииип-нзик.рф

JSC Scientific and Research Institute of Measurement Instrumentation – Novosibirsk Plant named after the Komintern (abbreviated as NPO NIIIP-NZiK, Russian: Научно-исследовательский институт измерительных приборов — Новосибирский завод имени Коминтерна) – Soviet/Russian large scientific and production joint venture (NPO) working in the field of radiotechnics. Both NIIIP and NZiK located in Novosibirsk. General director is Pavel Zabolotniy.

== History ==
Founded in St. Petersburg in 1911 on the base of Kronstadt radiotelegraph workshop, laboratory and a warehouse named Radiotelegraph Depot of Sea Office (Ministry de la Marine impériale de Russie). In 1922 renamed Radiotelegraph Plant named after the Komintern. In 1941 evacuated to Novosibirsk by the decision of State Defense Committeeю

Design Bureau of Komintern Plant (OKB) separated as NII-208 by the decision no. 3516-1465 of Central Committee and the USSR Council of Ministers on August 15, 1949. By the Decree of USSR Ministry of Radio Industry (MRP) no. 160 on March 24, 1966 NII-208 renamed NIIIP. Known as FGUP NIIIP since 1999. Part of Almaz-Antey as reconnaissance and informational unit. NIIIP and NZiK joined on December 7, 2010. Official name became JSC «NPO NIIIP-NZiK».

== Products ==
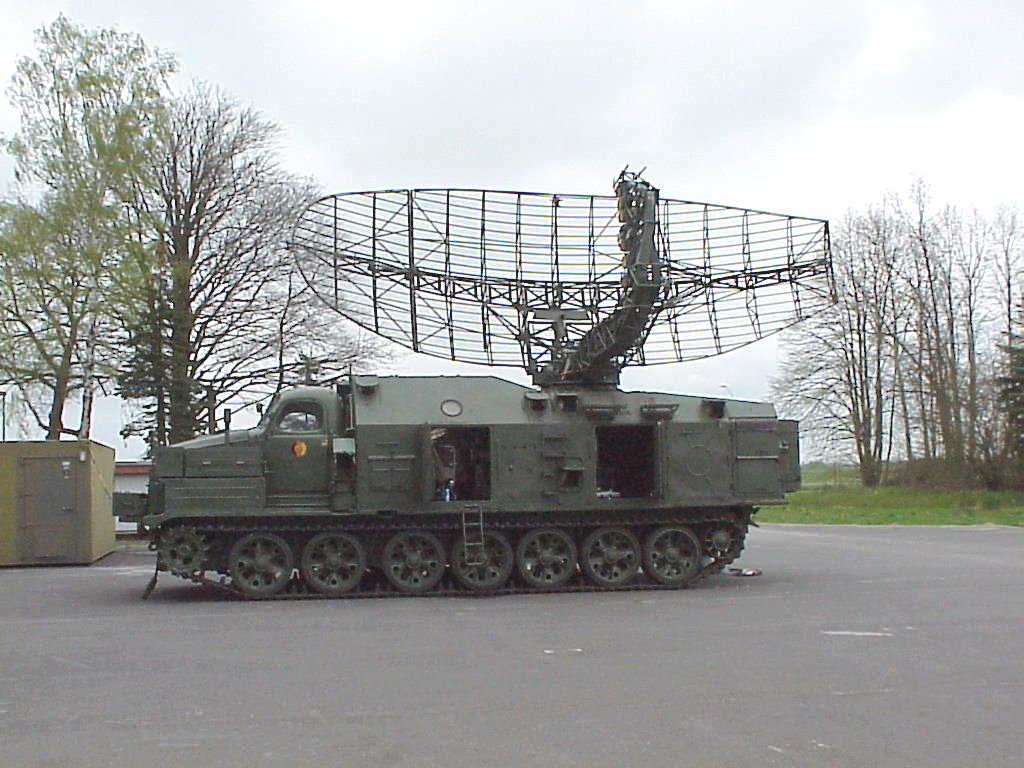
P-40 of the former National People's Army of the German Democratic Republic, 2007

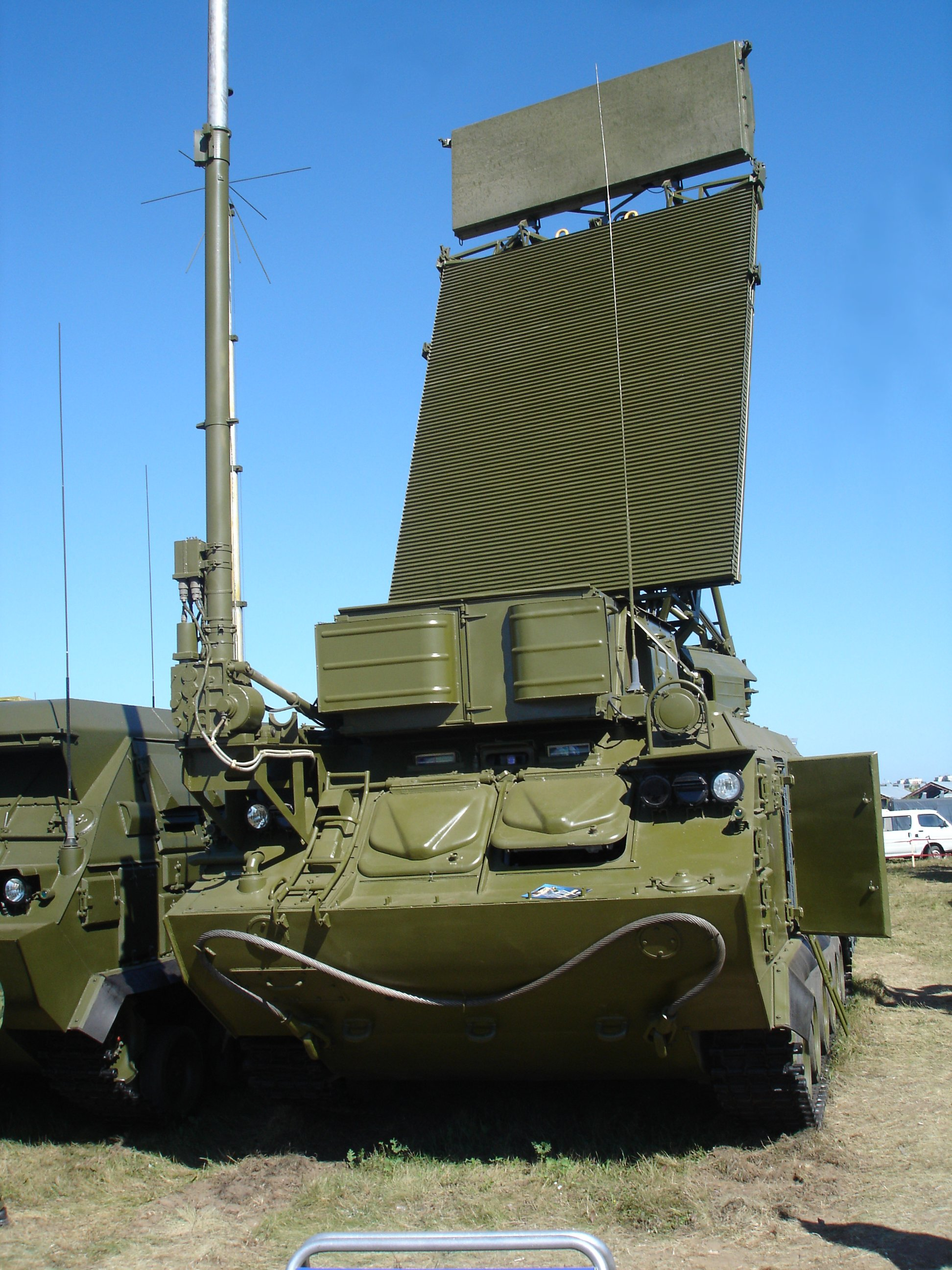
9S18M1-1 target acquisition radar for Buk-M1-2 at 2005 MAKS Airshow

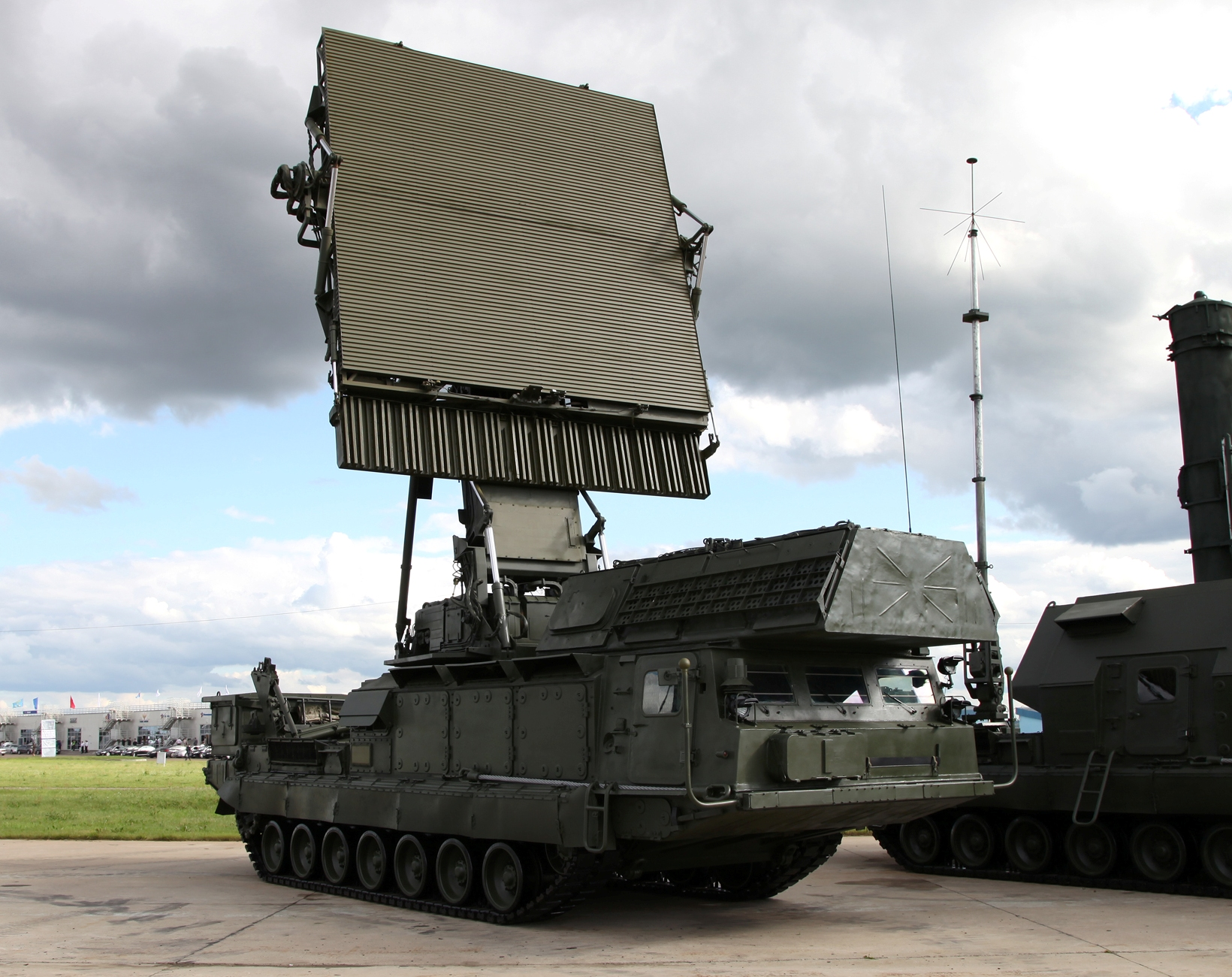
9S15M Obzor-3 acquisition radar for S-300V at Engineering Technologies 2012

- Target acquisition radars with circular scan (TAR CS)
  - Unified mobile TAR CS 1S12 with 1RL111D radar (1965) and Rangefinder (P-40 radar) for Krug missile system (chief designers L.F.Alterman, V.V.Raizberg)
  - TAR CS 1S12A (1RL128D) is a 1968 3D upgrade of 1S12 which provided a low altitude target detection on larger ranges (chief designer N.A. Volskiy)
  - Unified mobile TAR CS 9S15, 9S15M (1RL140) Obzor-3 (NATO: Bill Board) vehicle with various speed mechanical circular scan and electronical scan by the one-sided PAR for S-300V (1977–1983, chief designers V.V.Raizberg, Yu.A.Kuznetsov) Export version was called 9S15MT3. In 1990 the new major upgrade 9S15M2 was developed for S-300VM (chief designers Yu.A.Kuznetsov, G.N.Golubev) which incorporated a target track creation, analogue on-board instruments replaced with digital.
  - Unified mobile TAR 9S18 (1RL135) Kupol (NATO: Snow Drift) vehicle with mechanical circular scan and electronical vertical scan for 9K37 Buk missile system (1977, chief designers V.N. Shkoldin, A.P.Vetoshko, Yu.P.Shchekotov). In 1983 a TAR CS 9S18M1 for Buk-M1 was completed with PAR. Export version was called 9S18M1E.
  - TAR CS 5N64 with mechanical circular scan and electronical scan by the double-sided PAR in both dimensions for S-300P (1980, chief designers V.V.Raizberg, Yu.A.Kuznetsov). It was provided in two variants – dismountable 5N64K (in 3 transport containers) and 5N64S (5N64A) mobile road-train MAZ-7410-9988.
  - Self-propelled TAR CS 64N6 (64N6E) for S-300PM missile system and 83M6 C&C system (S-300PMU1) is a 5N64 upgrade (1988, chief designers Yu.A.Kuznetsov, G.N.Golubev). Based on a road-train MAZ-7410-9988. Export version was called 64N6E.
  - Self-propelled radar system 91N6 for S-400 missile system
- IFF systems (up to 1982)
  - Ground IFF systems for S-300 missile system
  - Autonomous IFF for Kremniy-1 identification system (1950, chief designer M.N.Tarshish)
  - Basic IFF for Kremniy-2 identification system (1955, chief designers A.A.Serkin, Z.B.Gaidukov)
  - IFF for Kremniy-2M identification system (1960, chief designer A.A.Yurov
  - Unified autonomous IFF 71E6, 73E6, 75E6 and 1L22 for Parol identification system, unified embedded IFF 1L23-6, 76E6 and 1L24 for Parol identification system, ground IFF transponder 1L26 for Parol system (1975–1980)
  - Lightweight IFF 1RL246 for Strela-1 and Strela-10, 1RL247 for MANPADS Strela-2 and Strela-3 and IFF 1L14 for Igla-1 (1977)
- Civil products
  - Failure protection devices for use with EPT lines
  - Load limiters for overhead and Gantry cranes
  - Radiotheodolite Malakhit for complex studies of atmosphere (1955) (chief designer I.P.Elman) It was used by Soviet Antarctic Expedition for the solar activity studies during International Geophysical Year

== Management ==
CEO from 2007 — Zabolotny Pavel Vasilyevich.

Director 1969-1980 — Sazhenyuk Anatoly Yemelyanovich.

== Known people ==
- V.N. Shkoldin, A.P.Vetoshko, Yu.P.Shchekotov, chief designers of TAR CS 9S18, 9S18M1, 9S18M1E
- L.F.Alterman, V.V.Raizberg, N.A. Volskiy, chief designers of TAR CS 1S12, 1S12A
- V.V.Raizberg, Yu.A.Kuznetsov, G.N.Golubev, chief designers of TAR CS 9S15, 9S15M, 9S15MT3, 9S15M2, 5N64, 64N6 (64N6E)
- Marina Popovich worked as designing engineer in 1951—1953.
- Dmitriy Vilmitskiy, since 2016 NTO-1 director
