= Antey Concern =

Company based in Moscow, Russia

Antey Concern (Russian: НПО Антей) was a defense industry company based in Moscow, Russia. In 2002 it was merged with NPO Almaz to form Almaz-Antey.

The Antey Concern specialized in the production of high-performance surface-to-air missile systems and sophisticated radio-engineering products. Antey produced the S-300V (SA-12) long-range anti-aircraft, anti-missile system and the Tor (SA-15) short-range battlefield system. Antey also specialized in the development and production of commercial refrigeration equipment, domestic radio electronic devices, and consumer goods.

The Concern comprised two scientific research institutes and several large plants, including the Scientific Research Institute of Electromechanics (NIIEhM) and a machinery production plant in Volzhsk (Volzhskprodmash) that specialized in a wide range of refrigeration installations. Antey also reportedly included a co-located plant that produced printed circuits and other electronic products on an experimental scale.

== History ==
NPO Antey at the time of its creation in 1983 consisted of three enterprises:

- Scientific Research Electromechanical Institute (Moscow)
- Strela Research Institute (Tula)
- Arsenal Plant (Tula)

In 1988 the NPO Antey already included nine enterprises, including the Izhevsk Electromechanical Plant and the Mari Machine-Building Plant.

In 1991 due to changes in legislation the NPO Antey was transformed into the Antey Concern.

By Decree of the Government of Russia dated December 01, 1994 No.1309, on the basis of the Antey Concern, it was created OJSC Industrial company Antey Concern with the consolidation of 100% of its shares in federal ownership. The group already consisted of fifteen enterprises.

В 2002 году была начата реализация ФЦП «Реформирование и развитие оборонно-промышленного комплекса (2002—2006 годы)», в основу которой положено образование вертикально-интегрированных структур из числа предприятий оборонно-промышленного комплекса России.

In 2002, the Federal Target Program "Reforming and Development of the military-industrial complex (2002-2006)" was launched, which is based on the formation of vertically integrated structures from among the enterprises of the Russian military-industrial complex.

By Decree of the President of the Russian Federation No.412 dated April 23, 2002, JSC Industrial Company Concern Antey was further expanded by merging with NPO Almaz and other enterprises and renamed Almaz-Antey Corporation. It includes forty-six industrial and research enterprises and organizations.
