= Avitek =

Defense manufacturer in Kirov, Russia

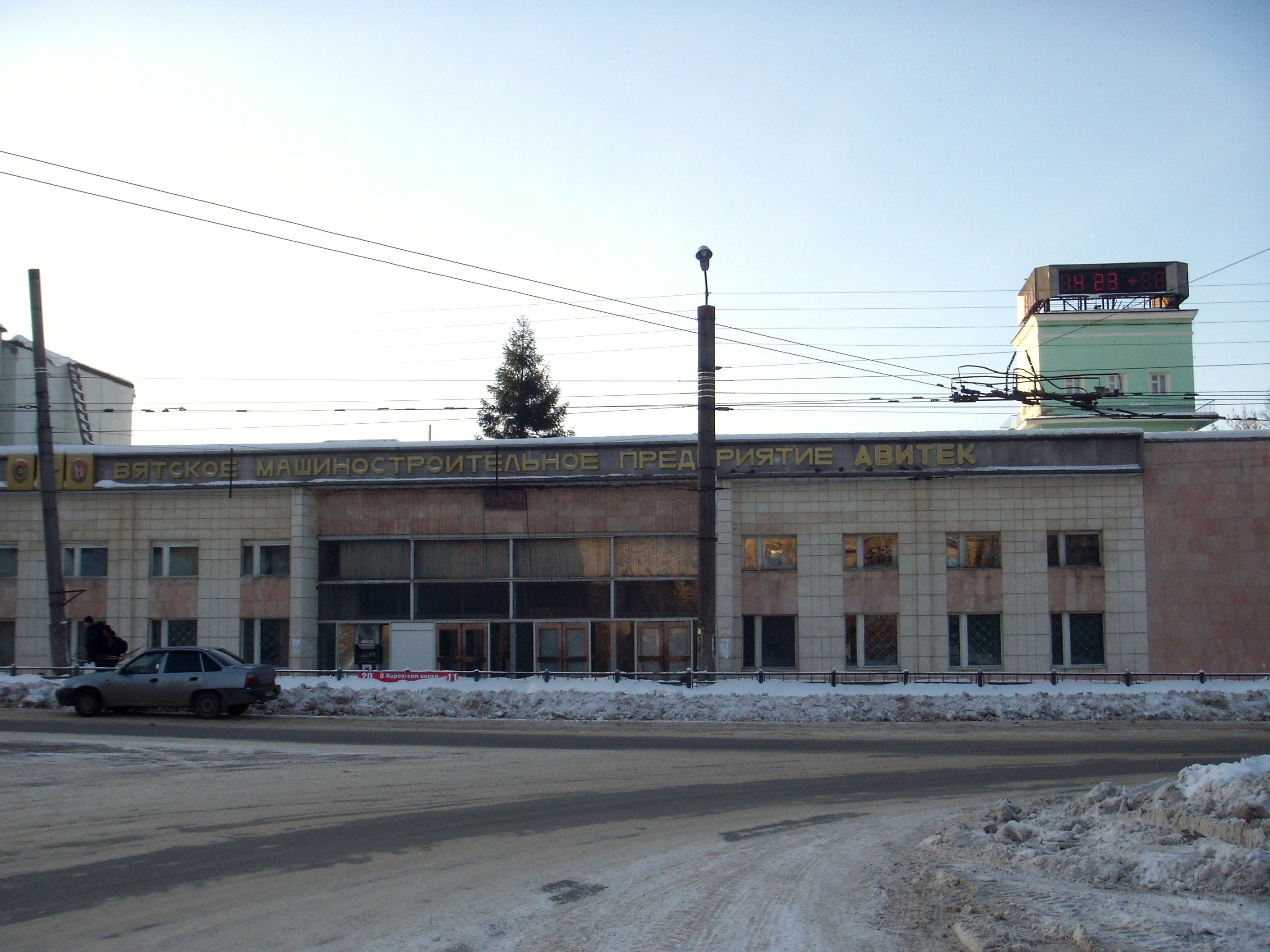
- Avitek factory gate
- Native name: Вятское машиностроительное предприятие „АВИТЕК“
- Founded: 1931
- Number of employees: 6,583
- Website: http://www.vmpavitec.ru/

Avitek (Russian: Вятское машиностроительное предприятие „АВИТЕК“, romanized: Vjatskoje mašinostroitelʹnoje predprijatije „AVITJeK“) is a Russian defense company based in the city of Kirov. It manufactures guided anti-aircraft missiles, aircraft armaments and subsystems. It also manufactures ejection seats.

Avitek produces the 9M334 anti-aircraft missile modules for the Tor missile system, the K-36 and K-Z6D-3.5 catapults, missiles, lifting devices for aircraft, and armament suspension for helicopters.

Avitek was established in 1931 as the Moscow Aviation Plant No. 32. It was evacuated to Vyatka (now known as Kirov) during World War II. Since 2002 it is part of the Almaz-Antey holding.

== Operation ==
Previously the company produced various types of missiles, including for: "Pechora", "Osa-AK", "Tor" and "Kinzhal" air defense systems, "Volna", "Storm" ship air defense systems, "Osa-M" air defense systems, RM-5V27A "Pischal" target missiles and 9F841M "Saman-M" air target simulators.

In the 2010s the plant produced 9M334 anti-aircraft missile modules for TOR complexes, K-36 and K-Z6D-3.5 catapult chairs, target missiles, lifting mechanisms for aviation, beam holders for helicopters, maintenance and repair services for previously supplied military equipment are provided.

Among the civilian products manufactured at the plant: locomotive driver's chairs, diesel engines, as well as vibration stoves that have already been discontinued, "Mini-Vyatka" washing machines, spare parts for the KIR-1.5 mower.

== Management ==
CEO – Ivanov Alexander Vladimirovich
