= Marine Scientific Research Institute of radioelectronics =

Soviet-Russian research institute

Marine Scientific Research Institute of Radioelectronics
- Type: Open joint-stock company
- Industry: Defense
- Founded: 1933
- Defunct: 2010
- Fate: became a research unit of NPO Almaz
- Headquarters: Moscow, Russia
- Parent: Almaz-Antey

Marine Scientific Research Institute of radioelectronics or MNIIRE Altair design bureau (Russian: Морской научно-исследовательский институт радиоэлектроники - МНИИРЭ «Альтаир») is a Soviet/Russian enterprise, developer of naval SA missile systems and radars. Headquartered in Moscow.

== History ==
Founded in 1933 as the All-Union State Institute of Telemechanics and Communication for the development of new weapon types for the Red Army and the Red Navy.

In 1940 the institute was granted the Lenin Prize for the development of Rif, Zarnitsa and Angara radars for the small ships, torpedo boats and minesweepers

In 1984 received the second Lenin Prize for the development of multi-channel SAM systems like Shtil, Rif and Klinok that allowed to combat the anti-ship missiles.

In 2010 Altair became a subsidiary of NPO Almaz, as the company's Science & Technical Center. Altair ceased to exist as a separate legal entity during the same year (December 22, 2010).

== Products ==
Major developments:

- S-300F (SA-N-6 "Grumble"), naval SAM system
- Uragan/Shtil (SA-N-7 "Gadfly"), naval multirole SAM system
- Kinzhal/Klinok (SA-N-9 "Gauntlet"), naval SAM system
- Gibka, the ship turret launcher 3M-47
- Podzagolovok-23, Basic Collective Mutual Interference Avoidance System

== Management ==
- 1933-1937: Suchkov F. F.
- 1937-1940: Shorin A. F.
- 1940-1942: ?
- 1942-1949: Kalmykov V. D.
- 1949-1952: Savelyev B. N.
- 1953-1976: Petelin M. P.
- 1976-1978: Bukatov V. A.
- 1978-1986: Malennikov L. B.
- 1986-1991: Izmaylov V. F.
- 1991-2006: Klimov S. A.
- 2006-2007: Gusev V. N.
- 2008-2010: Dobrik I. I.
