= Moscow Machine Building Plant "Avangard" =

Missile manufacturing company

Moscow Machine Building Plant Avangard
- Founded: 1942
- Headquarters: Moscow, Russia
- Parent: Almaz-Antey

MMZ Avangard (Russian: Московский машиностроительный завод "Авангард") is a Moscow-based manufacturer and the sole supplier of missiles for the S-400 system. It is part of the Almaz-Antey group.

Avangard was established in 1942, and it has produced airframes for strategic surface-to-air missiles since the 1950s and is the lead production facility for the Fakel Design Bureau in Moscow. In its latest available annual report for 2012, the company stated that it was finishing work on starting serial production of the 40N6 missile. No information on its performance or commissioning has been released since.

In October 2012, the former director of the plant was arrested on charges of embezzlement, after being accused of signing consultancy contracts with shell companies.

== History ==
On January 24, 1942 the USSR State Defense Committee decided to assemble aircraft engines for U-2 aircraft at the site of previously evacuated CIAM enterprises.

After the end of hostilities, the plant began to produce civilian products. These were engines and spare parts for agricultural machinery and consumer goods. But then it started producing military equipment again (aviation cannons and machine guns).

In 1954 the company mastered the production of D1 type anti-aircraft missiles for the S-75 air defense system. In the 50-60 years MZA launched a series of 11Д, 13D, 15D, 20D, 5В29, 5Я23 missiles.

In the 1970s the plant began to produce high-precision guided missiles At-500 for the s-300P air defense system, the A-135 missile system. In 1986 production of more advanced 48H6P missiles for the upgraded s-300PM began.

== Sanctions ==
In January 2023 Japan imposed sanctions on MMZ Avangard.

Sanctioned by Canada on 22 August 2023 for association with the "Putin regime".
