= 42S6 Morfey =

Russian Tracked Surface-to-air missile system

42S6 Morfej RZV-MD
- Type: Tracked SAM system, TEL
- Place of origin: Russia

Service history
- Used by: Russia PVO (incorporated with (V)VKO into VKS (VS RF) in 2014-15)

Production history
- Designer: Almaz-Antey
- Designed: 2007 , development test 2025 -

Specifications (Tor-M2)
- Main armament: 9M338K

42S6 Morfey or Morfei (Морфей, after the god of dreams in Greek mythology Morpheus) with missile 9M338K or RZV-MD based and derived from the Tor-M2, is a short range air defense system under development for the Russian Armed Forces. Is a mobile system with a range of 5 km (3 mi). Development has been ongoing since 2007 and it was supposed to be introduced in 2015. It was reported to feature an omnidirectional cupola-type radar with an active electronically scanned array. Is being developed by Almaz-Antey.

- This system is designated as a short-range air defense system to protect the S-400 missile system from various threats at their terminal phases, and will also act together with the S-350E as a supplement to the S-400 missile system. Together, these systems form part of the Aerospace Defence Forces.
- Development of Morfey started in 2007. It was planned to be introduced in 2013, however this was delayed until at least 2015. The missile system consists of an omnidirectional 29YA6 radar, infrared sensors and 36 missiles. The missiles have up to 15 km range and an altitude of up to 5000 m. . As 2025 the program is being revamped , testing undergoing.

9M338K
- Type: Surface-to-air missile
- Place of origin: Russia

Service history
- Used by: Russia PVO now VKS united with VKO

Specifications (9M338K)
- Warhead: HE
- Engine: Solid-propellant rocket
- Propellant: Solid fuel

== See also ==
- 2K22 Tunguska
- Buk missile system – Soviet and Russian surface-to-air missile system
- K30 Biho – South Korean Self-propelled anti-aircraft weapon
- LD-2000 Gai – Chinese automated close-in weapons system
- Pantsir missile system
