= Arzamas Instrument-Building Plant =

Company in Arzamas, Russia

Coordinates: 55°23′27″N 43°50′09″E

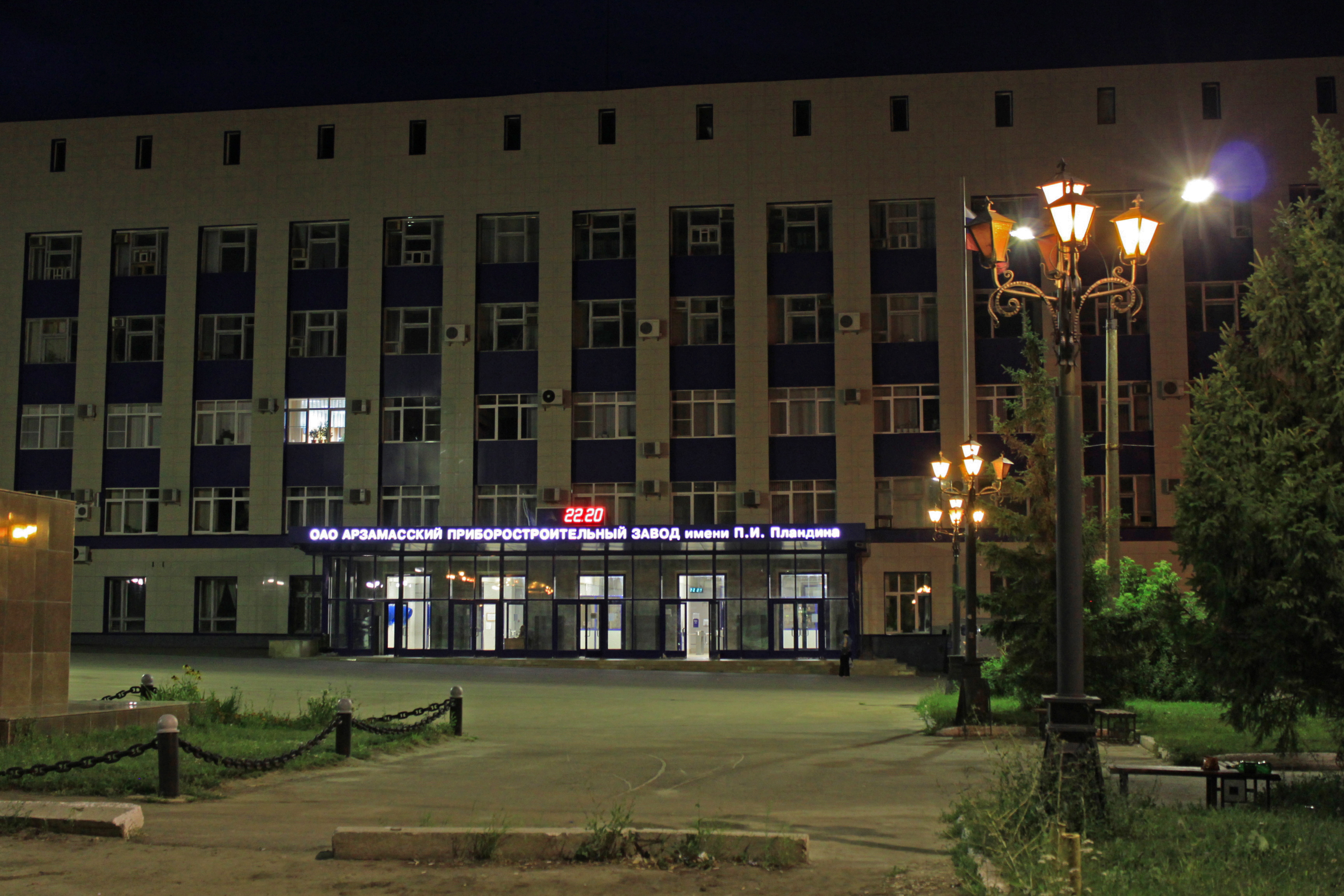
Arzamas Instrument-Building Plant

Arzamas Instrument-Building Plant (Russian: Арзамасский приборостроительный завод) is an instrument-manufacturing company based in Arzamas, Russia. It was established in 1957 and is part of the Russian Arms organization Almaz-Antey.

The plant manufactures gyroscopic instruments, control systems, onboard electronic computers, steering gears, control and verification systems. In the early 1990s, the Arzamas Instrument-Building Production Association had reportedly almost completely converted from production of gyroscopes for military purposes to production of consumer products in four areas: audio equipment, medical equipment, metering devices, and computerized control devices.

== History ==
On September 21 1955 the Ministry of Aviation Industry of the USSR appointed Alexey Ivanovich Stafeev director of the A-161 enterprise under construction in Arzamas (the future Arzamas Instrument-Making Plant). Construction began on May 4, 1956.

In the spring of 1957 the Arzamas region was abolished, and its territory was annexed to the Gorky region, in connection with which a part of the buildings that previously housed regional institutions was transferred to the plant under construction. Due to this, serial production was started on May 22, 1957. Initially, the plant produced electrodynamic flashlights.

Later the production of filmoscopes was launched, and at the end of 1957 the plant began to produce oxygen indicators and remote liquid oxygen indicators. After some time, the company mastered the production of integrated connectors for the pilot's seat in an airplane, thereby opening a new page in its history.

== Main indicators ==
The number of employees is more than 6 thousand.

Almost 90% of the products are produced under the state defense order.

== Directors ==
- A. I. Stafeev (September 21, 1955 — 1958)
- P. I. Plandin (November 17, 1958 — October 5, 1987)
- Yu. P. Startsev (October 29, 1987 — June 7, 2008)
- O. V. Lavrichev (June 7, 2008 — January 12, 2020)
- A. A. Kapustin (January 13, 2020 — present)
