= Design Bureau for Special Machine-Building =

Soviet-Russian industry enterprise

KB SM

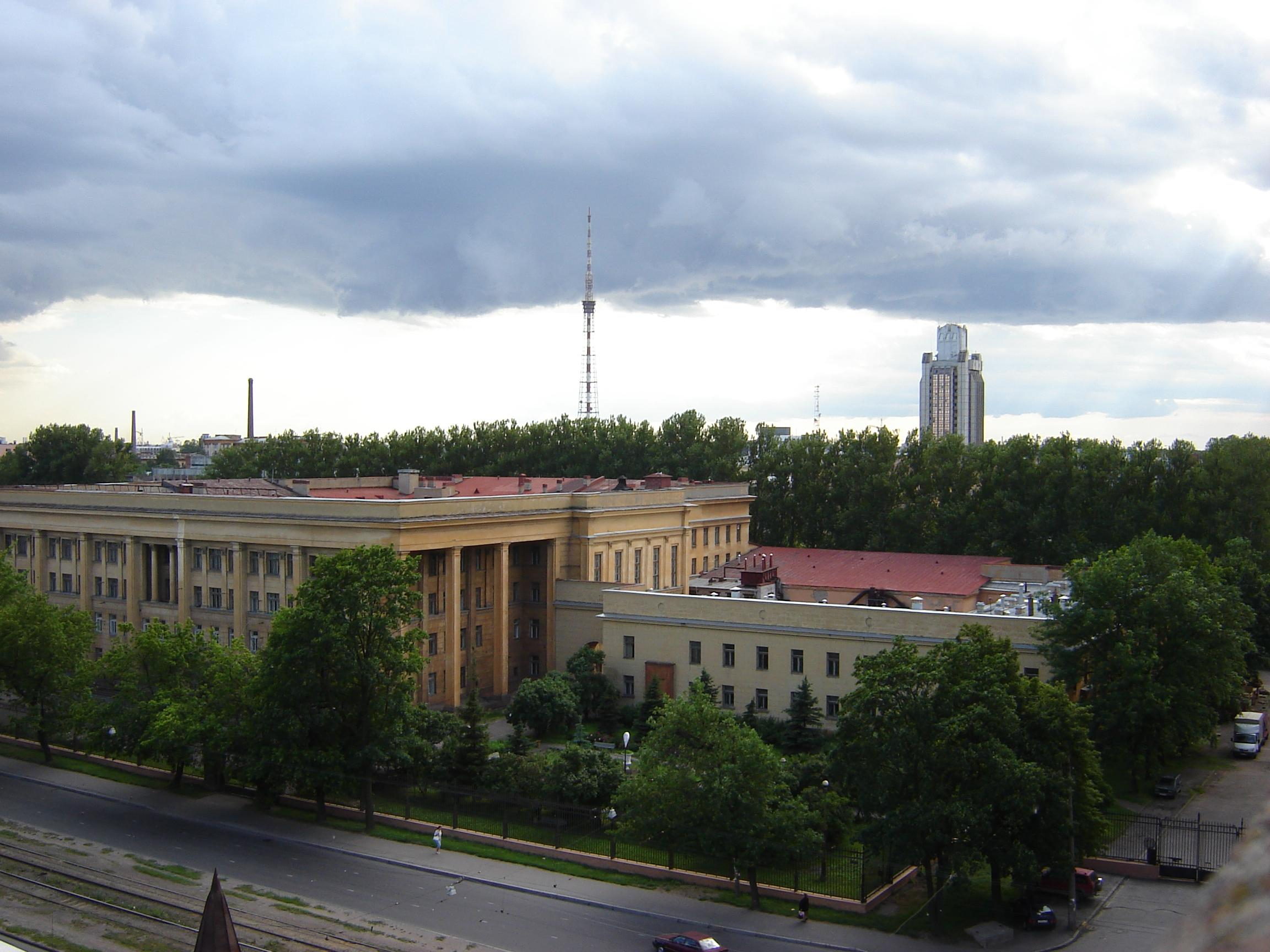
- Former headquarters on Lesnoy prospect in Saint Petersburg
- Type: Joint stock company
- Industry: space rockets
- Founded: March 8, 1945
- Headquarters: St. Petersburg, Russia
- Key people: Vladimir Dolbenkov (Head of the KB, since 2007)
- Products: Ballistic missiles, ICBMs, cruise missile launchers, radar stations
- Parent: Almaz-Antey
- Website: Official site of KB SM

JSC Design Bureau for Special Machine-Building (KB SM; Russian: КБ СМ, Конструкторское бюро специального машиностроения) is a Soviet-Russian space rockets industry enterprise. Currently, it is part of Almaz-Antey.

KB SM developed and produced a number of launch systems for air defence, Navy and Strategic Missile Troops.

Currently, KB SM develop reinforced concrete containers for long-term storage and transportation of spent nuclear fuel and ship-based nuclear power plants TUK108/1. KB SM is responsible for the creation of railway cranes carrying 80 tons or 150 tons for the Soviet/Russian Ministry of Railways.

== History ==
Founded by the order of People's Commissar of Armaments no. 110 on March 21, 1945 in accordance with the decree of the USSR State Committee of Defense no. 7739 on March 8, 1945, under the name Naval artillery central design bureau, MATsBK (Russian: МАЦКБ, Морское артиллерийское центральное конструкторское бюро), it was the Leningrad branch of Grabin's Central Artillery Design Bureau.

Since 1948 it was known as Central Design Bureau no. 34 (CKB-34) and since 1966 as KBSM (Design bureau of mechanization, Russian: Конструкторским бюро средств механизации). Since 1989, bureau received its current name, Spetsmash (also KB SM). Ilya Ivanov, artillery and missile designer and scientist, became the first head of KB. After 1959, his successors were A.M. Shakhov (1959—1974), S. P. Kovalis (1974—1987), and N. A. Trofimov (1987—2007).

== Products ==
The organization designs (develops) and participates in the manufacture, installation and operation:

- Ground-based equipment of fixed- and mobile-based rocket and space complexes
- Antenna installations of the short-wave (mm) range for mobile basing
- Antenna installations in the short-wave (mm) and long-wave ranges for space radio communications, radio and space research and broadcasting
- Precision pivoting devices for guidance of optical and optoelectronic systems and any special equipment weighing several tons or more
- Equipment of thermal vacuum chambers for ground tests of spacecraft, including pivoting devices, light and reflective shields, auxiliary equipment
- High-capacity assembly and docking equipment for precise assembly of large-sized products up to several tens of meters in size
- Vehicles for RCT products with provision of thermostatting of transported spacecraft
  - Railway and automobile cranes with a lifting capacity of 80-150 tons
  - Launchers for ground and underwater launch of cruise missiles
  - Launchers and antenna posts for air defense systems
