= Anatoly Basistov =

Soviet electronic engineer (1920–1998)

- Born: Anatoly Georgievich Basistov; 23 October 1920; Saratov, RSFSR
- Died: 16 September 1998 (aged 77); Moscow, Russian SFSR, Soviet Union
- Education: Moscow Power Engineering Institute
- Scientific career
- Fields: Radio engineering and electronics

Anatoly Georgievich Basistov (Russian: Анатолий Георгиевич Басистов; 23 October 1920 – 16 September 1998) was a Soviet and Russian scientist in the field of radio engineering and electronics. He was awarded Hero of Socialist Labour.

== Biography ==
He was born in 1920 in Saratov.

From 1938 to 1941 he studied at the Moscow Power Engineering Institute, then, because of the beginning of the Great Patriotic War, he moved to the Leningrad Air Force Academy of the Red Army, which he graduated in 1944. From August 1944 in the army he fought as navigator of the aviation regiment.

After the war ended, he remained in the Ministry of Defense of the USSR. Since 1950, he worked in the KB-1 of the Ministry of Defense Industry, then at the Ministry of Radio Industry's CB to create air defense systems, where he took part in the development of the multi-channel anti-aircraft anti-aircraft defense system of Moscow.

From 1968 onwards he worked at the Vympel Special Design Bureau (OKB) on the development of anti-missile defense (ABM) systems, participated in the development of the S-200 multi-channel long-range anti-aircraft missile system.

For the development of the complex S-200, received the title of Hero of Socialist Labour.

The main scientific works are devoted to improving the efficiency of signal filtering and the resolution of radar systems; the development of multifunctional missile defense information systems based on radar facilities and optoelectronic devices controlled by high-performance ground and on-board computers; the development of complexes of control systems of aircraft, affecting air and space objects.
