= Garpiya =

Russian combat drone

Garpiya is a family of Russian long-range combat drone produced by IEMZ Kupol for use in the Russo-Ukrainian war.

== Manufacturing ==
The Garpiya is produced by IEMZ Kupol which is a subsidiary of Almaz-Antey. IEMZ Kupol has set up a factory in China to produce kits for export to Russia. The main Russian manufacturing facility for Garpiyas is in Izhevsk, located in a former concrete plant acquired by IEMZ Kupol in 2020.

The Garpiya incorporate engines, parts, and technology from China but is assembled in Russia. According to the company, 500 drones were produced in the second half of 2023 and 2,000 were produced in the first half of 2024.

== Combat history ==
Their use and production was first extensively reported on by Reuters in 2024. According to Reuters, the Garpiya-A1 has been used against Ukrainian civilian and military targets in the Russo-Ukrainian war. In 2025, around 500 Garpiya variants were reportedly being used each month in Ukraine.

The Russian Africa Corps have deployed the Garpiya-A1 during the Mali War with the wreckage of a KK variant being found near Sévaré in May 2026.

== Design ==
They are similar in design to the HESA Shahed 136. The engine is a Limbach L550E from Xiamen Limbach.

== Variants ==
- Garpiya-1A (initial variant)
- Garpiya-3 (advanced variant)

== See also ==
- Russian strikes against Ukrainian infrastructure
- S8000 Banderol
