= Vektor State Enterprise =

Coordinates: 56°50′19″N 60°38′38″E

JSC Vektor State Enterprise
- Type: Joint-stock company
- Industry: Defense industry
- Founded: 1941
- Headquarters: Yekaterinburg, Russia
- Products: Electronics, Guidance systems, Radars
- Parent: Almaz-Antey
- Website: www.vektor.ru

JSC Vektor State Enterprise (Russian: Уральское производственное предприятие „Вектор“) is a company based in Yekaterinburg, Russia. It is part of the Almaz-Antey defense holding.

Vektor State Enterprise produces military electronics including missile-related guidance systems and radars. In the 1990s it was developing conversion products including medical, agricultural, and telecommunications equipment.

== History ==
It was organized in 1941 on the basis of the Moscow Geodesy plant evacuated to Sverdlovsk.

At first it was called plant No. 356, in 1966-1992 — Sverdlovsk Plant of Electroautomatics.

In 2002, the Federal State Unitary Enterprise Vector, by Decree of the President of the Russian Federation and the decision of the Ministry of State Property Management of the Sverdlovsk Region, was transformed into JSC Ural Production Enterprise Vector, 100% of whose shares remained state-owned.

For 15 years, Vector has been a monopolist in the production of domestic electric musical instruments and sound amplification equipment.

== Awards ==
The company was awarded the Order of the Red Banner of Labor in 1966 for the successes achieved in completing the tasks of the seven-year-old.

== Products ==
- Payphone equipment
- Radio relay equipment
- Equipment of digital transmission systems
- Household computers, disk drives, joysticks
- Start-up chargers
- Electric cord with plug, extension cords
- Gas and electric gas stoves, gas cylinder connecting devices
- Furniture and furniture accessories
- Microplasma plant for metal cutting and welding
- Electric loader power supply system
- Track switches, interlock switches
- Cargo and passenger elevator control devices
- Push-button posts (elevator. obor-e)
- Light displays (elevator. obor-e)

The organization is also engaged in military developments.
