= S-300VM missile system =

S-300VM Antey 2500 NATO reporting name: SA-23 Gladiator\Giant
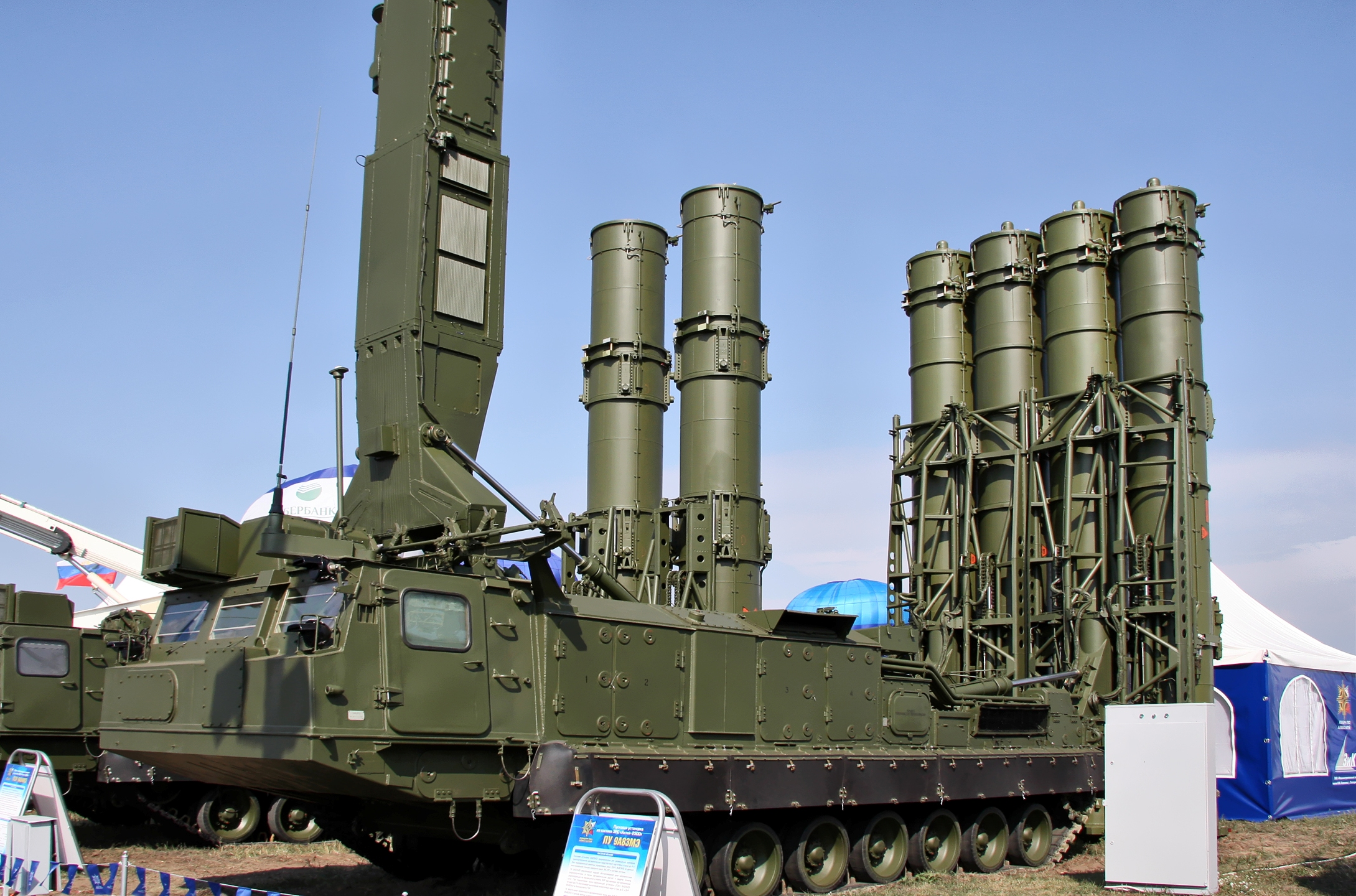
- Antey-2500 SAM at MAKS-2011
- Type: Mobile surface-to air/anti-ballistic missile system
- Place of origin: Russia

Service history
- In service: 2013–present
- Used by: See Operators

Production history
- Designer: Almaz-Antey
- Designed: 2000s
- Manufacturer: Almaz-Antey
- Unit cost: US$120 million (1999)
- Produced: 2013–present
- Variants: See Variants

Specifications
- Operational range: 200 (250) km against MRBMs

9M82M missile
- Type: Surface-to-air missile
- Place of origin: Russia

Service history
- In service: 2013–present
- Used by: See Operators

Production history
- Designer: Almaz-Antey
- Designed: 2000s
- Manufacturer: Almaz-Antey
- Produced: 2013–present
- Variants: 9M82M, 9M83M

Specifications (9M82M)
- Operational range: 200 kilometres (120 mi)
- Flight altitude: 30,000 metres (98,000 ft)

The S-300VM "Antey-2500" (Russian: С-300ВМ Антеӣ-2500, NATO reporting name SA-23 Gladiator/Giant) is a Russian anti-ballistic missile system. The system is designed to target short- and medium-range ballistic missiles, aeroballistic missiles, cruise missiles, fixed-wing aircraft, loitering ECM platforms, and precision-guided munitions.

== Structure ==
=== Components ===
The Antey-2500 air defense missile system features:

- Battle performance automation due to high-speed digital computers
- Passive electronically scanned array radars with advanced data processing methods
- High ECM immunity
- High mobility and autonomous operation
- High firepower potential, irrespective of air attack tactics or sequence
- Vertical launch from a special transport launch canister
- Maintenance-free operation of missiles for at least ten years
- Capability to defeat ballistic missile individual warheads
- Inertial guidance with radio command mid-course update and semi-active radar homing at the terminal phase
- Focused detonation of the missile warhead

The Antey-2500 system comprises:

- Command post
- Circular and sector scan radars
- A Multichannel Missile Guidance Station (MMGS) which has 24 channels for illumination of 24 targets
- 9A82M launcher (typical amount of 8 missiles) which includes radar of illumination, targeting, and internals of the radar
- 9A83M launcher (typical amount of 12 missiles) which includes radar of illumination, targeting, and internals of the radar
- 9A84M and 9A85M loader-launcher (technical maximum of 24 missiles)
- 9M82M and 9M83M air defense missiles
- Maintenance, repair, and transport of vehicles
- Group SPTA set
- Electronic trainer for MMGS operators
- Set of missile handling equipment

Technical ability to use 1–2 additional battalions.

=== Missile ===
The 9M82M missile is intended to defeat tactical, theater, and medium-range ballistic missiles, as well as aerodynamic targets at a range of up to 200 km. The Antey-2500 system is mounted on a tracked cross-country vehicle equipped with self-contained power supply and navigation systems, as well as surveying and positioning equipment.

== Variants ==
- S-300V: began operating in 1983; 100 km range
- S-300VM: 250 km range
- S-300VMD: 350 km range
- S-300V4: in service since 2014; 400 km range; Antey-4000 are the export version.

== Operational history ==
In early October 2016, a battery of Russian S-300V4 missile system was deployed to Syria, at the Russian naval base in Tartus. In early December 2020, the system entered combat duty on the Kuril Islands.

On 18 August 2023, a Ukrainian drone captured videos of HIMARS artillery rockets destroying S-300V4 surface-to-air missiles in the Russo-Ukrainian War.

On 25 February 2025, Ukrainian forces destroyed a S-300VM missile system in Zaporizhia Oblast using a bomber drone. The drone then landed to record the attack as the S-300V4 burned.

== S-300 system family tree ==
S-300 Family
S-300V	S-300P	S-300F
S-300V1	S-300V2	S-300PT	S-300PS	Fort	Rif
S-300VM	S-300PT-1	S-300PM	S-300PMU	Fort-M	Rif-M
Favorit-S
S-300VM1	S-300VM2	S-300PT-1A	S-300PM1	S-300PMU1
Antey 2500	S-300PM2	S-300PMU2	Russian Version
S-300V4	Favorit	Export Version
S-300VMD	S-400

== Operators ==
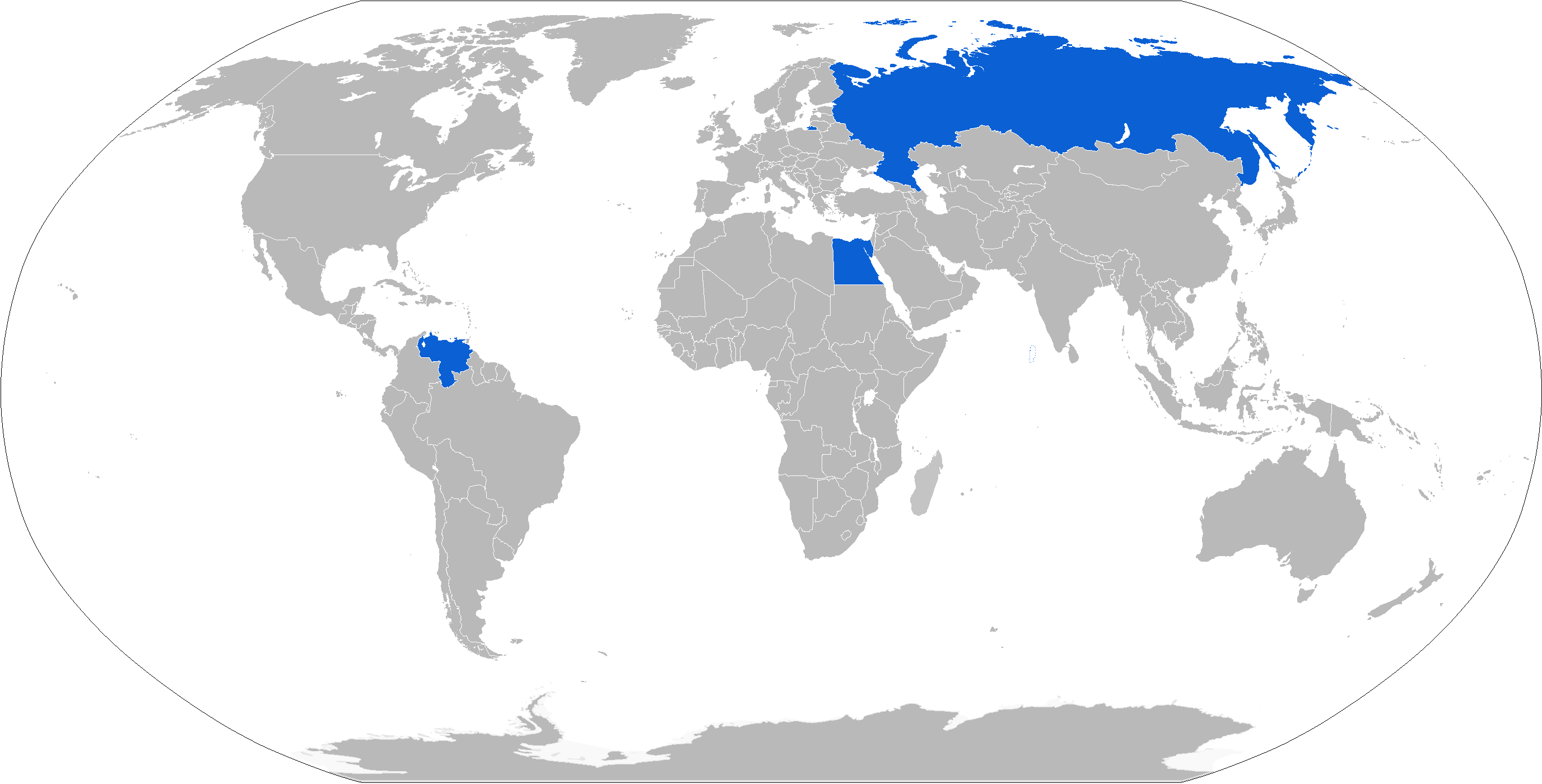
Map with S-300VM operators in blue

=== Current operators ===
- Russia: ordered more than three S-300V4 divisions by 2015
  - 77th Air defense brigade (Korenovsk) and 988th Air defense Regiment (Gyumri) in the Southern Military District
  - 202nd Air defense brigade (Naro-Fominsk) and 1545th Air defense Regiment (Znamensk) in the Western Military District
  - 1724th Air defense regiment (Birobidzhan and Yuzhno-Sakhalinsk) and air defense unit stationed in the Jewish Autonomous Region in the Eastern Military District
  - 28th Air defense Brigade (Mirny / Kirov oblast) in the Central Military District
  - Modernization of all S-300V to the version S-300V4 was to end in 2012.
- Egypt: Antey-2500 missile system was ordered in 2014, as part of a multi-billion Egyptian-Russian arms deal signed later that year. The $1 billion contract comprises 4 batteries, a command post, and other external elements. In 2015, Russia started delivering the system components, and Egyptian soldiers began their training in Russian training centers. By the end of 2017, all batteries were delivered to Egypt. Russia is in talks with Egypt on the delivery of additional Antey-2500 systems.
- Venezuela: 2 S-300VM in 1 air defense battalion at Base Aérea Militar Capitán Manuel Ríos

=== Potential operators ===
- Algeria: In November 2015 Algeria was negotiating the purchase of several battalions of this system.

=== Failed bids ===
- Turkey: Turkey was in talks with Russian officials for a co-production deal before the Sukhoi Su-24 shootdown incident.
- Saudi Arabia: Russia has offered Saudi Arabia the S-300VM as the first operator.

== See also ==
- List of medium-range and long-range SAMs
- S-300 missile system – (Soviet Union, Russia)
- S-350 missile system – (Russia)
- S-400 missile system – (Soviet Union, Russia)
- S-500 missile system – (Russia)
- Arrow – (Israel)
- Medium Extended Air Defense System – (United States, Germany, Italy)
- Ground-Based Midcourse Defense – (United States)
- MIM-104 Patriot – (United States)
- THAAD – (United States)
