= Izhevsk Electromechanical Plant =

Russian military enterprise

Coordinates: 56.8908°N 53.3264°E

- Type: State-owned joint-stock company
- Industry: Defense
- Founded: 1957
- Headquarters: Izhevsk, Russia
- Revenue: $347 million (2014)
- Parent: Almaz-Antey
- Website: kupol.ru

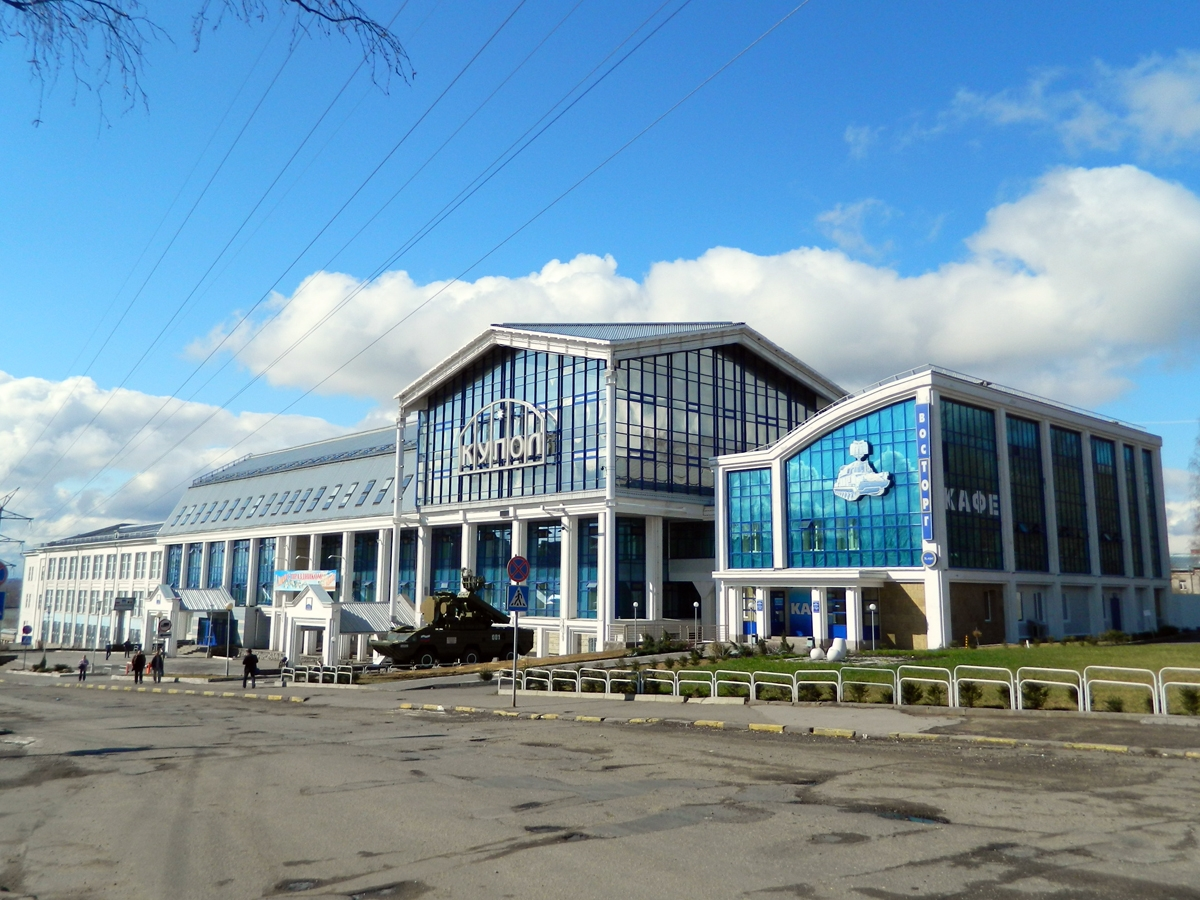
Main Building of KUPOL JSC

JSC Izhevsk Electromechanical Plant or IEMZ Kupol for short (Russian: Ижевский электромеханический завод «Купол») is a Russian military R&D enterprise founded in 1957. It is located in Izhevsk (3 Pesochnaya str). It is part of the state-owned Almaz-Antey holding.

According to a Reuters report from September 2024, two sources from a European intelligence agency had told the news agency that IEMZ Kupol had produced more than 2,500 drones of a new type, called Garpiya, from July 2023 to July 2024 which, as per documents seen by Reuters, had Chinese engines and parts. The intelligence sources told Reuters that the drones had been used by Russia during its invasion of Ukraine against military and civilian targets. The company has been sanctioned by the US since December 2023.

On 17 November 2024 social media and Ukraine's Center for Countering Disinformation claimed that the plant had been struck by a Ukrainian A-22 UCAV.

On 1 July 2025, it was reportedly hit by several drones from Ukraine, resulting in heavy fire and huge explosions, causing several fatalities and many injured requiring hospital treatment. Videos show drones hitting the roof of the structure, causing huge fireballs. Other videos apparently show panicked reactions as huge explosions were heard amid the fire and the plumes of smoke.

== Military products ==
- Osa-AKM SAM
- Saman-M1 target-launching complex
- Tor-M1 on tracked vehicle (older version of the Tor system)
- Tor-M2E, on tracked vehicle
- Tor-M2K on 6x6 wheeled vehicle
- Tor M2 km air defense system that can be transported on trucks and stationed on buildings and ships.
- 99F678M simulator of Tor-M2E (K) on all-terrain trucks with the operation team which can be trained realistically.
- Modernized 9K33M3 Osa-AKM (NATO code: SA-8 Gecko) to OSA-AKM1.
- 9K33M3 Osa-AKM equipped to fire rocket-targets.
- Carbon nanocomposites
- Metal alloys
- Adjutant missile-targets
- Typhoon-PVO air defense vehicle

== Civilian products ==
- Mobile and fixed heaters which are powered by gas and / or liquid fuel
- IR heaters
- Mobile heater fan
- Operated heating "Screens" / air showers electrically or via heat exchange fluid
- Gas-fired radiator heating
- heat exchangers
- Carbon nano-composite
- Wastewater treatment plants, sewage treatment plants
- Metal alloys
- Oil production technology (electric pump)
- Air conditioning systems for electric and diesel-powered locomotives
- Medical technology (infusion bags and infusion tubing)
- Ventilation valves for nuclear power plants
- Plastic packaging for cosmetics and foods
- Air traffic control systems like the Sintez ATC system
