= MKB Fakel =

Russian government-owned industrial corporation

- Type: Joint-stock company
- Industry: Defense
- Founded: 1953; 73 years ago
- Headquarters: Khimki, Russia
- Products: Anti-aircraft defence systems, Missiles, Anti-ballistic missiles
- Parent: Almaz-Antey
- Website: npofakel.ru

MKB "Fakel" (Russian: МКБ "Факел", "Torch"), also known as Grushin Machine-building Design Bureau, is a Russian government-owned aerospace defense corporation located in Khimki, Moscow Oblast, Russia.

== History ==
MKB Fakel was founded in 1953 under the designation OKB-2 to facilitate development of guided surface-to-air missiles in response to a growing threat of US air attack on the Soviet Union and its allies. MKB Fakel developed missiles which were used in Soviet surface-to-air defense systems S-75, 9K33 Osa, S-125, S-200, S-300, and many other systems.

In July 1958 the corporation was awarded an Order of Lenin for successful development of guided missiles for the S-75 defense system.

Missiles developed by MKB Fakel were the first in the world surface-to-air guided missiles successfully employed in military action. On May 1, 1960, American high altitude reconnaissance aircraft Lockheed U-2 was shot down near Sverdlovsk by Fakel's 11D missile (S-75) while flying over Soviet territory.
Overall, missiles developed by MKB "Fakel" were employed in more than 30 countries, including Cuba, China, Vietnam and destroyed more than 2,500 of enemy aircraft.

In April 1981 it was awarded an Order of the October Revolution for successful development of guided missiles for the S-300 defense system.

In 2002 the company joined the Almaz-Antey holding.

In 2025, MKB Fakel developed a new anti-drone missile designed to counter small, low-flying aerial threats such as unmanned aerial vehicles (UAVs). The system was unveiled as part of Russia's broader efforts to enhance air defence capabilities against emerging drone-based warfare.

== Production ==
The bureau has designed the following tactical and strategic surface-to-air missiles, as well as exoatmospheric anti-ballistic missile interceptors:

- V-750 series missiles (for SA-2 / S-75) systems),
- 5V24 (V-600), 5V27 (V-601) missiles (for SA-3 / S-125 systems),
- 5V21, 5V28, 5V28V missiles (for SA-5 / S-200 systems),
- 5V55K, 5V55R, 5V55R / 5V55KD, 5V55U, 48N6, 48N6E2 missiles (for SA-10 and SA-20 / S-300P-series systems),
- 40N6 (for the SA-21 / S-400 system),
- 9M96 series (for the SA-21 / S-400 and the S-350 systems),
- 9M33, 9M33M1, 9M33M2, 9M33M3, 9A33BM3 missiles (for SA-8 / 9K33 Osa system),
- 9M330, 9M331, 9M332, 9M338 missiles (for the SA-15 / 9K330 Tor-series systems),
- 51T6 (SH-11) Gorgon missile (for the A-135 ABM-system).

== Management ==
Since its foundation on November 20, 1953 and for 38 years, the Fakel ICD has been led by an outstanding engineer, scientist, academician, founder of the school of anti-aircraft rocket engineering Pyotr Dmitrievich Grushin. Later, the company was headed by Vladimir Grigoryevich Svetlov, Gennady Viktorovich Kozhin, Sergey Borisovich Levochkin. At the moment, the General director of JSC MKB Fakel is Viktor Valentinovich Doronin.

== Awards ==
- Order of Lenin (1958)
- Order of the October Revolution (1981)
- 11 Fakel employees were awarded the Lenin Prize and 13 – USSR State Prize
