= Tor missile system =

Russian surface-to-air missile

9K330 Tor NATO reporting name: SA-15 Gauntlet, SA-N-9 Gauntlet
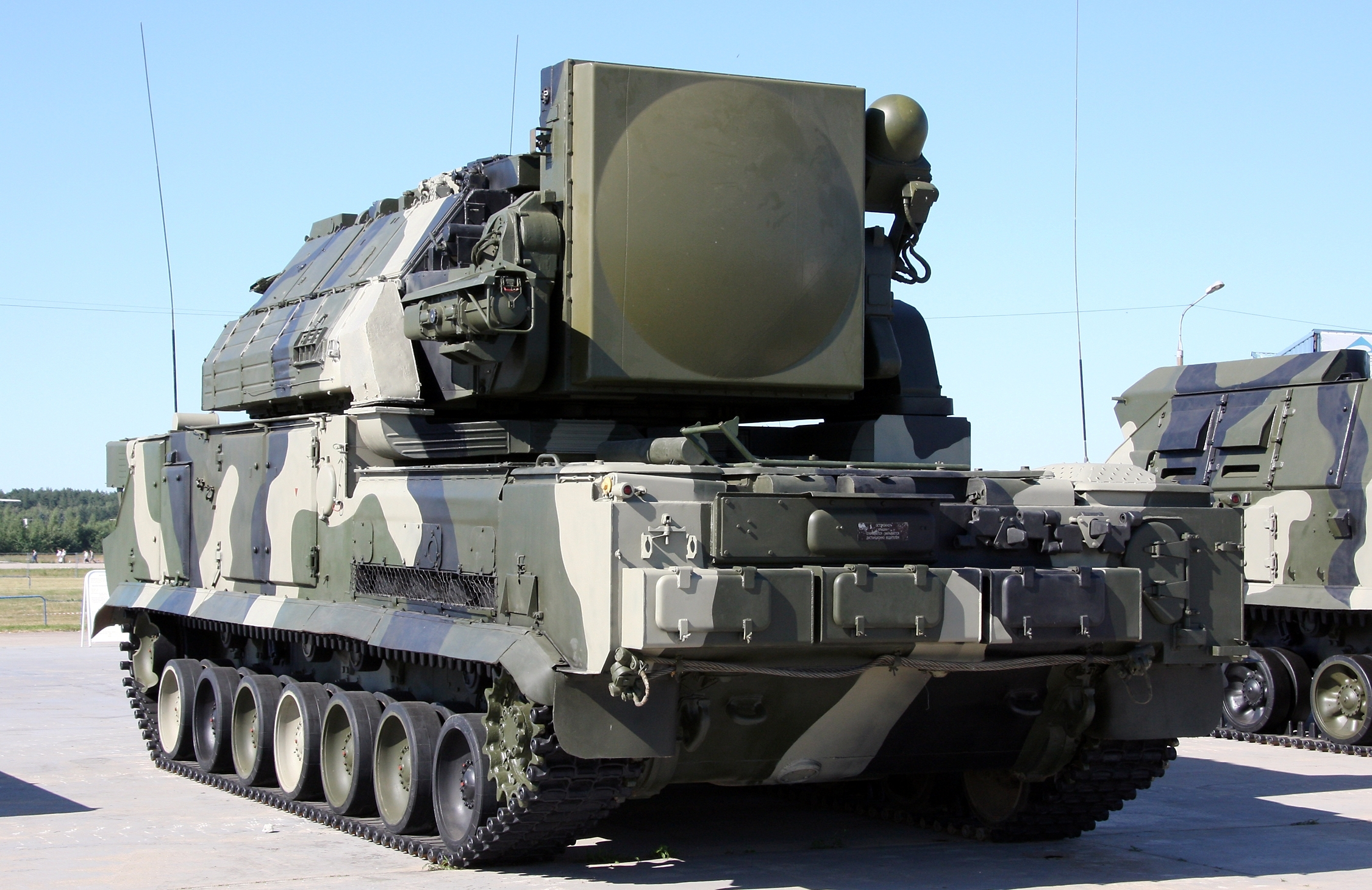
- 9K330 TLAR (rear view of the chassis)
- Type: Tracked SAM system
- Place of origin: Soviet Union/Russia

Service history
- In service: 1986–present
- Used by: See list of operators

Production history
- Designer: Almaz-Antey: Antey design bureau (lead designer) MKB Fakel (missile designer) MNIIRE Altair (naval version designer)
- Designed: 1975
- Manufacturer: IEMZ Kupol; Metrowagonmash (GM chassis designer); MZKT (wheeled chassis designer)
- Produced: 1983–present
- Variants: Tor, Tor-M1, Tor-M2, Tor-M1-2U

Specifications (Tor-M1)
- Mass: 34 tonnes (33 long tons; 37 short tons)
- Length: 7,500 millimetres (300 in)
- Width: 3,300 millimetres (130 in)
- Height: 5,100 millimetres (200 in) (radar mast unstowed)
- Crew: 3
- Main armament: 9M330, 9M331
- Engine: V-12 diesel 618 kilowatts (829 hp)
- Transmission: hydromechanical
- Suspension: torsion bar
- Ground clearance: 450 millimetres (18 in)
- Operational range: 25 kilometres (16 mi)
- Maximum speed: 65 kilometres per hour (40 mph)

The Tor (Russian: Тор, lit. 'torus') is an all-weather, low-to medium-altitude, short-range surface-to-air missile system designed for destroying airplanes, helicopters, cruise missiles, unmanned aerial vehicles and short-range ballistic threats (anti-munitions). Originally developed by the Soviet Union under the GRAU designation 9K330 Tor, the system is commonly known by its NATO reporting name, SA-15 "Gauntlet". A navalized variant was developed under the name 3K95 "Kinzhal", also known as the SA-N-9 "Gauntlet". Tor was designed to shoot down guided weapons like the AGM-86 ALCM and BGM-34 day and night, in bad weather and jamming situations. Tor can detect targets while on the move. The vehicle must stop intermittently when firing, although trials have been conducted with the goal of eliminating this restriction.

== Development ==
The development of the Tor missile system started on 4 February 1975, in response to the directives of the Central Committee of the CPSU. Initiated as a successor to the 9K33 Osa (NATO reporting name SA-8 "Gecko"), development of the land based version was conducted in parallel with the naval variant of the system (3K95 Kinzhal/SA-N-9 "Gauntlet"), to be installed on a number of upcoming ship classes, including the Kirov-class battlecruisers, and retrofitted onto older ships. Responsibility for development was given to the Antey design bureau (headed by V.P. Efremov), the missiles designed by MKB Fakel (under P.D. Grushin) and the Altair design bureau (headed by S.A. Fadeyev) was responsible for the development of Kinzhal. All the developers and manufacturers of the Tor missile system unified into Almaz-Antey in 2002.

In early 2023, it was reported that the Tor system had received some "fine-tuning" to improve dealing with missiles fired by the US-made HIMARS system.

In February 2024 it was reported that Izhevsk Electromechanical Plant will conduct a modernization of Tor-M2 systems.

== Characteristics ==
=== Description ===
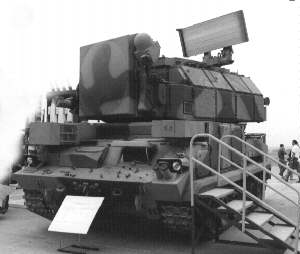
A 9K332 TLAR with tracking radar covered.

The closest foreign equivalents to the Tor, in function and operation, are systems like the British Rapier missile and French Crotale missile systems, which some consider to have somewhat less performance than Tor (the other two systems being based on older equipment). All three systems are mobile and self-propelled, Tor using the 9A330 combat vehicle which carries a crew of four (one driver, three operators), and acts as an autonomous Transporter, Launcher, And Radar unit, or TLAR (similar to but distinct from a TELAR, as the Tor missile is vertically-launched and need not first be erected to a launch attitude before firing). The 9A330 is based on the GM-355 chassis manufactured by MMZ, the Tor-M1 using the improved GM-5955. It is equipped with NBC (nuclear, biological and chemical) protection. Like Rapier and Crotale, in addition to tracked platforms, there are also static, towed, and wheeled versions of the Tor system. Mobility time is 3 minutes, and it can be transported by any transport means (including aerial). The reaction time of the original Tor is 7–8 seconds while stationary, or 7–10 seconds if in motion, as the vehicle must halt before engaging.

=== TLAR features ===
Arranged in a similar fashion to the previous 9K33 Osa (Russian: «Оса») and 9K22 Tunguska (Russian: «Тунгуска») air defense systems, Tor's TLAR features a turret with a top mounted target acquisition radar, and frontal tracking radar, with 8 ready to fire missiles stored vertically between the two radars. The target acquisition radar is an F band pulse doppler 3D radar, equipped with a truncated parabolic antenna, and a mechanically, later electronically, scanned in azimuth with a 32 degree sector view, and has an average power output of 1.5 kW, which provides a maximum detection range of 25 kilometres (16 mi). For reference, a McDonnell Douglas F-15 at an altitude of 6 km has a detection probability of 0.8 at this range. The electronic 'heart' of the system is a digital fire control system, which allows detection of up to 48 targets and the tracking of ten at any one time, and integrates IFF functionality; the IFF antenna being mounted above the search radar.

=== Radar ===
The target engagement radar is a G band/H band (later K band) pulse doppler radar with an (in azimuth) passive electronically scanned array antenna. The radar is classed as a thinned array (design using fewer elements) incorporating only 570 phase shifters and uses linear polarization. The radar has an average power output of 0.6 kW providing a maximum detection range of 20 km/12 mi. An F-15 type aircraft had a detection probability of 0.8 at this range. Originally Tor could only engage one target at a time, and with only two of its missiles. Later variants of the Tor system (Tor-M1 and M2E) incorporate additional fire control channels, as well as improved fire control computers, allowing the system to engage two (M1) and then four (M2E) targets, while simultaneously guiding up to four (M1) and then eight (M2E) missiles. There is also a small antenna on the top of the target engagement radar to communicate with missiles after launch. Together these radars carry the NATO reporting name "Scrum Half". To reduce the dimensions of the vehicle, the target acquisition radar can be folded down horizontally when travelling, and the tracking radar can partially rotate away from vertical. To allow engagements in an ECM-heavy environment, the Tor missile system is equipped with an optical tracking system, complementing the main radar.

=== Mobility ===
As a fully mobile system, the Tor is capable of acquiring and tracking targets while the TLAR is moving. Due to the interference with launch operations while in motion, missiles can be fired only when the system is stationary. Once set up, the reaction time (from target detection to engagement) is described as 5–8 seconds, depending on the variant; however, reaction time is somewhat longer (around 10 seconds) while in motion and firing in short halts. To facilitate this mode of operation, an auxiliary power unit (APU) is fitted so that the main engine can be shut down while the radar and missile system continue to operate when stationary, enabling long periods of readiness. The digital computers allowed for a higher degree of automation than any previous Soviet system of its type. Target threat classification is automatic and the system can be operated with little operator input, if desired.

=== Typical deployment ===
Typically, a battery of four Tor vehicles is accompanied by the mobile Ranzhir-M (Russian: "Ранжир-М") command center, which provides automatic interaction with the Tor, 9K33 Osa, 9K31 Strela-1, 2K22 Tunguska. It allows for efficient allocation of tasks between the individual Tor-M1 crews and allows each TLAR to be linked into a wider air defense system, thereby increasing target detection range and reducing reaction time.

Tor vehicles are accompanied by the mobile Polyana-D4, which provides automatic interaction with the Tor, Buk, 2K22 Tunguska, S-300V (integrates all functions of several different systems into a single whole + various air force aircraft + direct transfer of target designation).

Tor-M1 receiving commands from Ranzhir-M / Polyana-D4 can shoot down targets in the range of 0–84 degrees. Tor-M1 system (the time of creating the version, 1991) can operate in a pair, then the angle of observation was 0–64 degrees (vertical).

Combat vehicle of Tor missile system provides simultaneous detection of up to 48 targets.

== Missiles ==
9M330
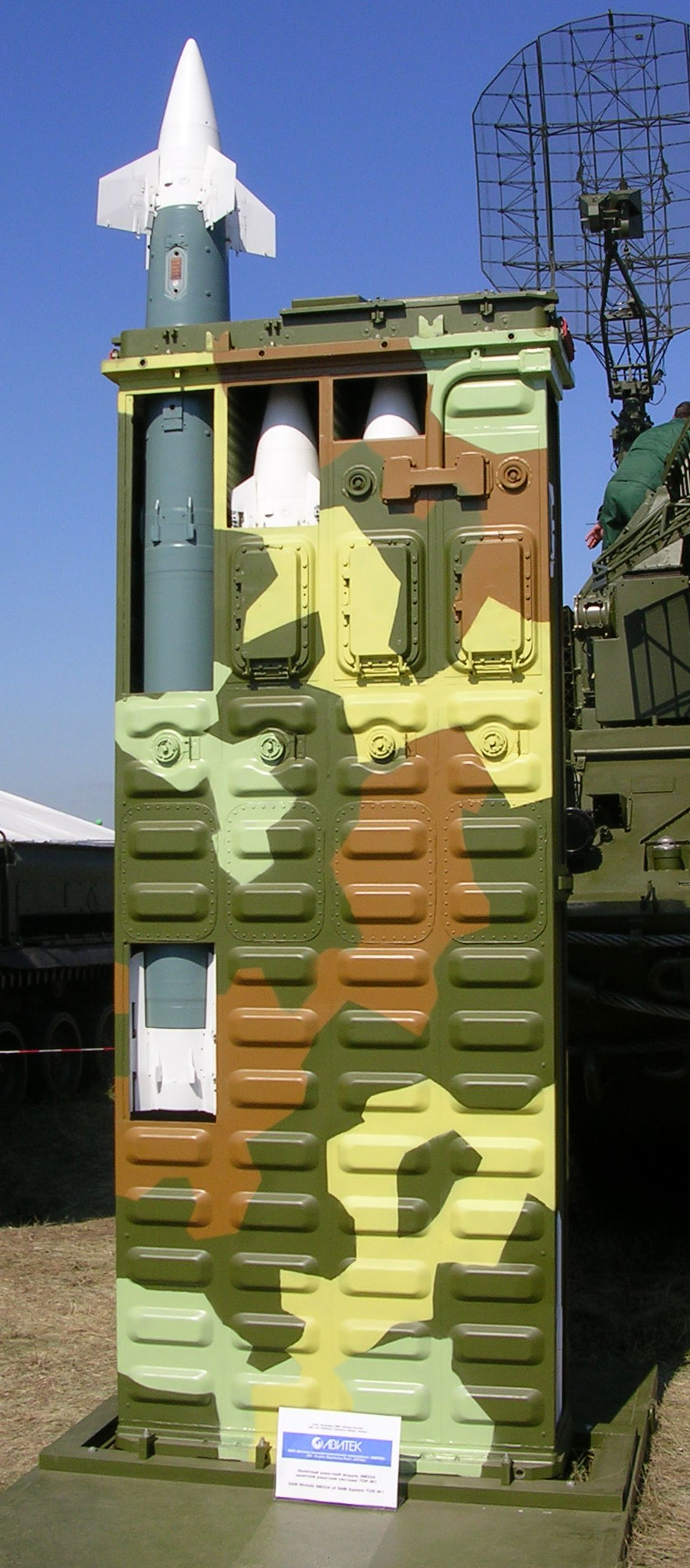
- Four 9M330 missiles in one of the two launching racks
- Type: Surface-to-air missile
- Place of origin: Soviet Union

Service history
- In service: 1986–present
- Used by: See list of operators

Production history
- Designer: Fakel
- Designed: 1975
- Manufacturer: IEMZ Kupol
- Produced: 1983
- Variants: 9M330, 9M331, 9M332, 9M338

Specifications (9M331)
- Mass: 167 kilograms (368 lb)
- Length: 2,900 millimetres (110 in)
- Diameter: 235 millimetres (9.3 in)
- Wingspan: 650 millimetres (26 in)
- Warhead: Frag-HE (fragmentation high explosives)
- Warhead weight: 15 kilograms (33 lb)
- Detonation mechanism: RF Proximity
- Propellant: Solid-fuel rocket
- Operational range: 12 kilometres (7.5 mi; 6.5 nmi)
- Flight ceiling: 6,000 metres (20,000 ft)
- Boost time: Cold launch ejection for 20 metres (66 ft)
- Maximum speed: 850 metres per second (Mach 2.5)
- Guidance system: Radio command
- Steering system: Gas dynamic control system, with four control surfaces
- Launch platform: 9A331 combat vehicle
- Transport: GM-569 tracked vehicle

The rockets were developed for the interception of small, aggressively maneuvering targets.

Weighing 167 kilograms (368 lb), the 9M330 missile is 3,000 millimetres (9.8 ft) long, carries a 15 kilograms (33 lb) warhead and has a peak speed of around Mach 2.8 (3,430 km/h; 2,130 mph). Using command guidance and radar controlled proximity fuzes, the missiles can maneuver at up to 30 g and engage targets flying at up to Mach 2 (2,500 km/h; 1,500 mph). Cold launched, the missiles are propelled out of the vehicle before the solid fuel rocket motor fires and the thrust vectoring system turns them toward their target. Missiles can also be fired against surface targets. Each missile is a sealed round, stored in two groups of four. Engagement range is up to 12 kilometres (7.5 mi; 6.5 nmi) with minimum range varying between 1,500–2,000 metres (4,900–6,600 ft), depending upon version and an effective altitude of 6–10,000 metres (20–32,808 ft).

A new 9M338 missile has been developed by Almaz Antey offering improved range and precision. Its smaller size also enables the modified Tor-M2 to be equipped with 16 missiles as opposed to the original 8.

== Variants ==
=== 9K330 Tor ===
The project was given strict design specifications to meet; Tor had to provide extended detection and tracking of fast, low radar cross section targets and be capable of quickly and efficiently dealing with massed air raids, while providing a high degree of automation and integration with other air defence assets. To meet these demanding specifications, the designers used a variety of new technologies, including advanced passive electronically scanned array radar for improved detection and tracking performance, enhanced digital information processing, and vertically launched missiles to improve reaction time and increase the number of readily available munitions. After testing and evaluation between December 1983 and December 1984, the land-based system was accepted into service on 19 March 1986.

=== 9K331 Tor-M1 ===
"Tor-M1", introduced in 1991 with the 9M331 missile, with greatly improved missile accuracy and the ability to engage two targets simultaneously, minimum range 1.5 km (0.93 mi), minimum height 10 metres (33 ft).

Even while the Tor was being introduced into service, work started on improving the system, resulting in an enhanced version, the Tor-M1. Many improvements over the original system were made; these included the addition of a second fire control channel, allowing two targets to be engaged at once; as well as upgrades to the optical tracking system and computer equipment. ECM protection and warhead design were also modified, as was the ammunition handling system. State tests, conducted between March and December 1989, showed that the result was a system which could engage more targets in a shorter time frame with reaction times reduced by over a second and an increased probability of target destruction. Further modifications occurred partly as a response of insight gained from the 1995 NATO bombing in Bosnia and Herzegovina resulting in the Tor-M1-1, or Tor-M1V, which offered improved network connectivity and ECM functions as well as protection against countermeasures.

In 1993 Tor, in the test conditions reflecting targets employing defensive countermeasures, repeatedly downed small-sized rockets (similar to the much later and static complexes Iron Dome 1 target) with a 100% success rate. In comparison, Tor-M2E achieved a 100% rate in 2009, Tor-M2 a 100% rate in 2013 (10 km), and Tor-M2 a 100% rate in 2014, all in heavy ECM environments against four simultaneous small, high-speed targets.

=== 9K332 Tor-M2E ===
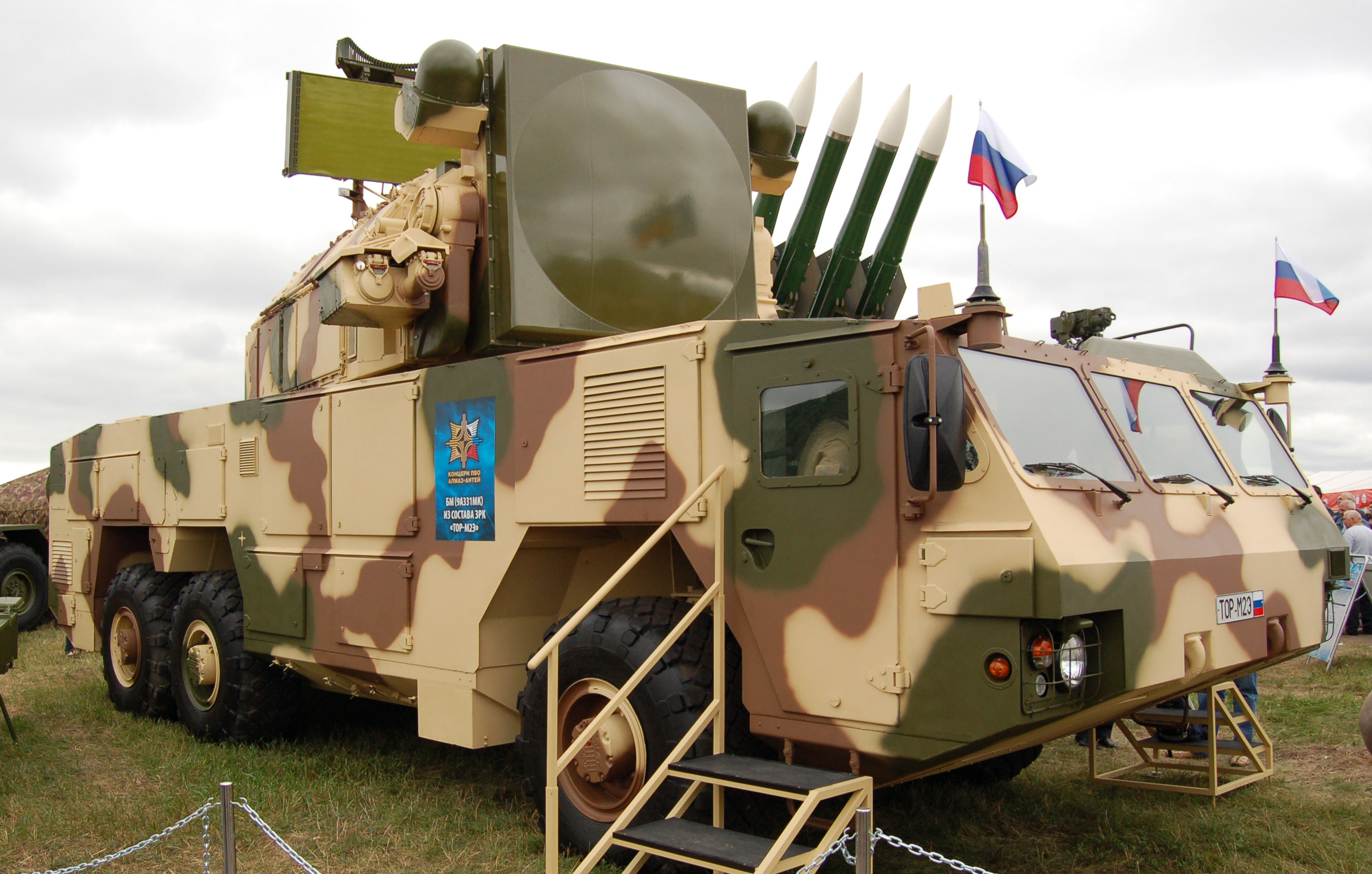
Tor M2E on MZKT-6922 vehicle features at the MAKS 2009 show (Buk missiles in the background)

Upgrades have continued over the lifetime of the system, with developer Almaz Antey unveiling the next incarnation of the Tor missile system, the Tor-M2E, at the MAKS Airshow in 2007.

This variant features:

- improved fire control radar coverage,
- four guidance channels, allowing up to four targets to be engaged simultaneously,
- protection against spoofing.

Ammunition of the Tor-M2 includes 8 missiles 9M331 or 16 missiles 9M338 with increased altitude and range. Tor-M2 missiles have a range of 16 km, maximum altitude of 10 km and maximum speed of 1000 m/s. The system is capable of short-stop firing, which takes 2–3 seconds for the system to go from motion to stationary and firing of the missile.

The Tor-M2E is offered in either wheeled or tracked chassis and is equipped with a new digital computer system and all weather optical tracking system. It is currently produced at OJSC Izhevsk Electromechanical plant «Kupol».

- "Tor-M2E (9К332МE)" – with a 9А331МE tracked chassis mounting two 9M334 missile modules with four 9М9331 missiles. Crew of 2. The system is fully automated.
- "Tor-M2K (9К332МК)" – with a wheeled 9А331МК chassis developed by the Belarusian company «MZKT» mounting two 9M334 missile modules, each with four 9М9331 missiles.
- "Tor-М2КМ (9К331МКМ)" – modular design (towed variant weight reduced to 15 tons), to accommodate various types of chassis. 9А331МК-1 TELAR mounting two 9M334 missile modules with four 9M9331 missiles. At MAKS-2013 this was shown on an Indian Tata chassis. The affected area expanded to height – 10 km, distance – 15. Crew of 2. Chance to destroy any target 98% as a minimum. Significantly improves the penetrating power of warhead fragments. The system is fully automated. Modules weighing 15 tons are installed on ships of the Russian Navy.

=== Tor-M1-2U ===
"Tor-M1-2U" entered service at the end of 2012. This system is designed to destroy aircraft, helicopters, UAVs, missiles, and other precision guided weapons, flying at medium, low and very low altitudes in all weather. The system is able to engage four targets simultaneously at a height of up to 10 kilometers. Its crew consists of three people. Deliveries are underway. It can hit targets on the move, at a speed of up to 25 km/h (includes all the necessary functions for independent fight).

=== 3K95 Kinzhal (naval variant) ===
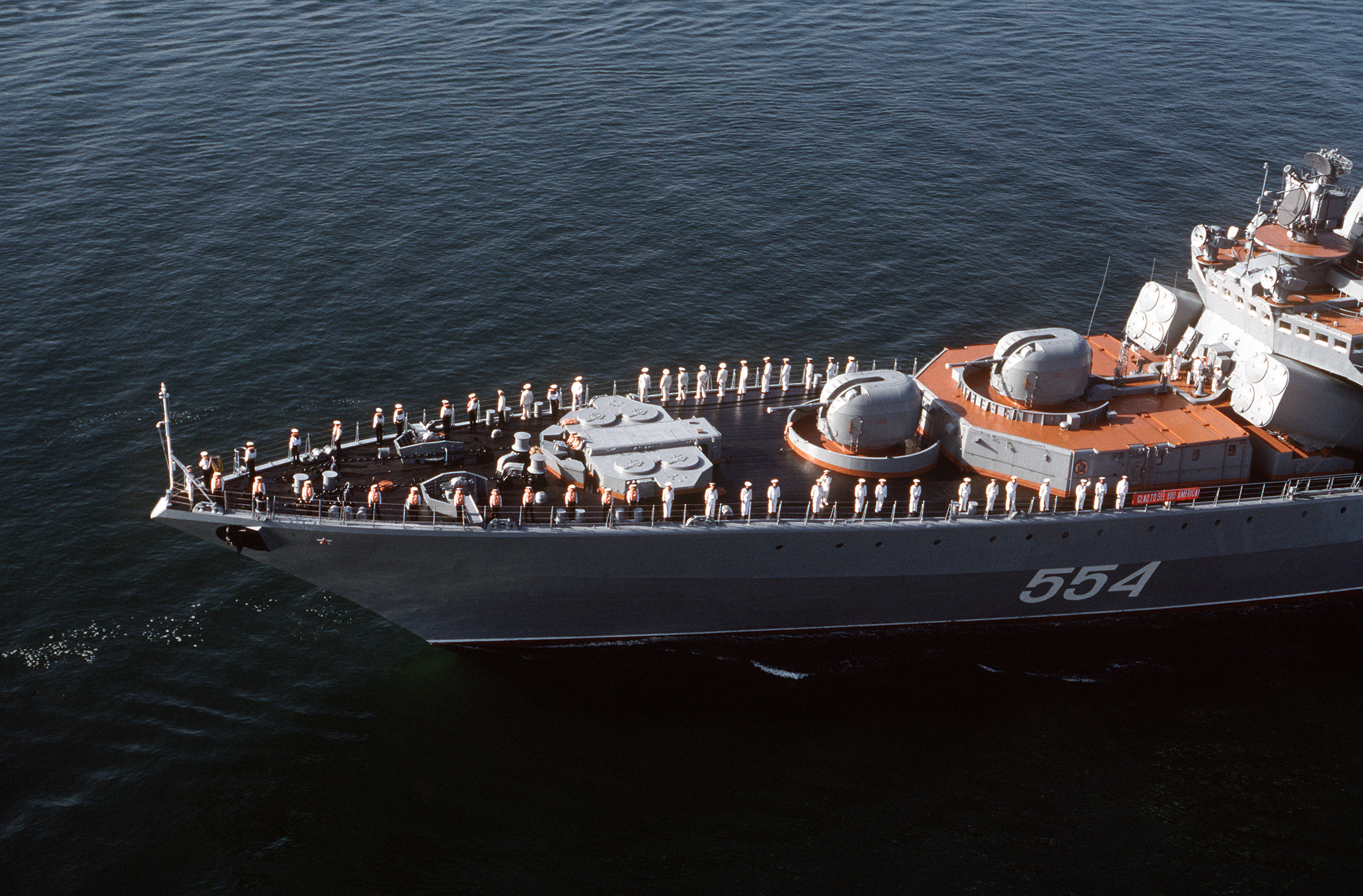
SA-N-9 launcher on the Udaloy-class destroyer Admiral Vinogradov.

The 3K95 "Kinzhal" (Russian: Кинжал – dagger) is the naval version of the Tor missile system developed by Altair and has the NATO reporting name SA-N-9 Gauntlet. Using the same 9M330 missile as the land based version, the system can be mounted on vessels displacing over 800 tonnes and is known to be installed on the Kuznetsov-class aircraft carrier, Kirov-class multimission cruisers, Udaloy-class anti-submarine destroyers and Neustrashimy-class frigates. The naval version of the later Tor-M1 is known as the "Yozh" (Russian: Ёж – hedgehog), while the export version of the Kinzhal is known as "Klinok" (Russian: Клинок – blade).

Despite starting testing earlier than its terrestrial counterpart, the naval variant, Kinzhal, had a more protracted development. After an extended testing period using a Project 1124 Grisha-class corvette (including the engagement and destruction of four P-5 Pyatyorka (SSC-1a Shaddock) anti-ship missiles in 1986) Kinzhal finally entered service in 1989.

Stored within rotary VLS modules, the missiles are clustered into launchers comprising three to six modules (32 (Neustrashimy), 64 (Udaloy) or 192 (Kuznetsov, Kirov) missiles) and mounted flush to the deck. Each module has up to eight missiles stored ready to fire; during firing the missile is cold launched using a gas catapult before the launcher brings the next round to a firing position.

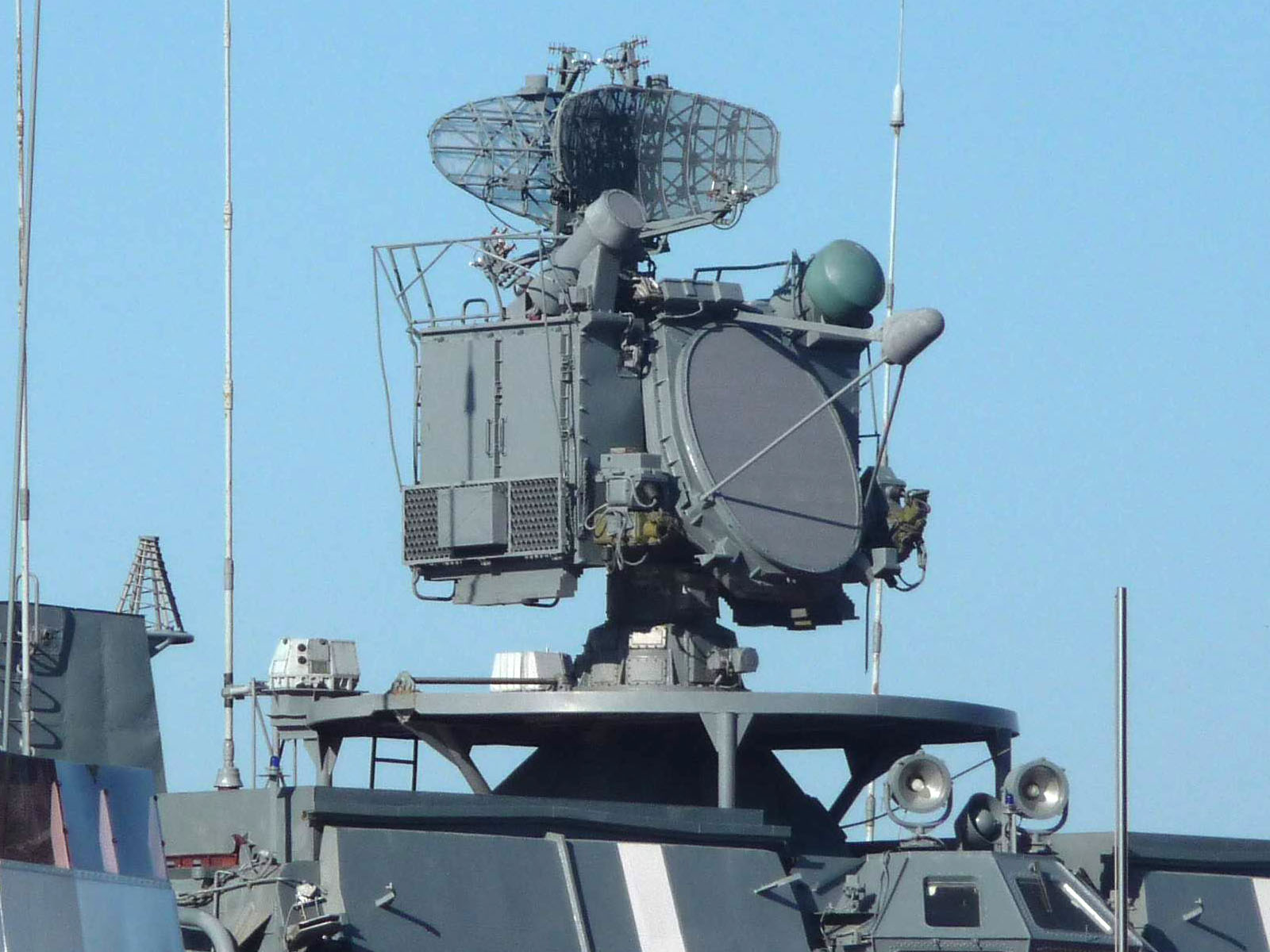
3R95 fire control radar

Fire control (FC) is handled by the 3R95 multi-channel FC system, (NATO reporting name Cross Swords), composed of two different radar sets, a G-band target acquisition radar (maximum detection range 45 km/28 mi,) and a K band target engagement radar, that handles the actual prosecution of a target.

Using two top mounted, mechanically scanned, parabolic target acquisition radars, the fire control system provides a 360 degree field of view, as well as IFF. The target engagement radar is a passive electronically scanned array antenna of the reflection type mounted on the front of the fire control system with a 60 degree field of view. Much like its land based sibling, the target engagement radar can track and guide eight missiles on up to four targets at once and is effective to a range of 1.5–12 km and an altitude of 10–6000 m. The system is managed by a crew of 13. Additional missile guidance antennae can be seen around the fire control system and the 3K95, like the upgraded Tor launchers, is equipped with a secondary infrared guidance system. The 3R95 can also provide fire control information for the vessels AK-630 close in weapons systems (CIWS) providing a second line of defence should anything penetrate the missile layer.

=== Tor-M2KM ===
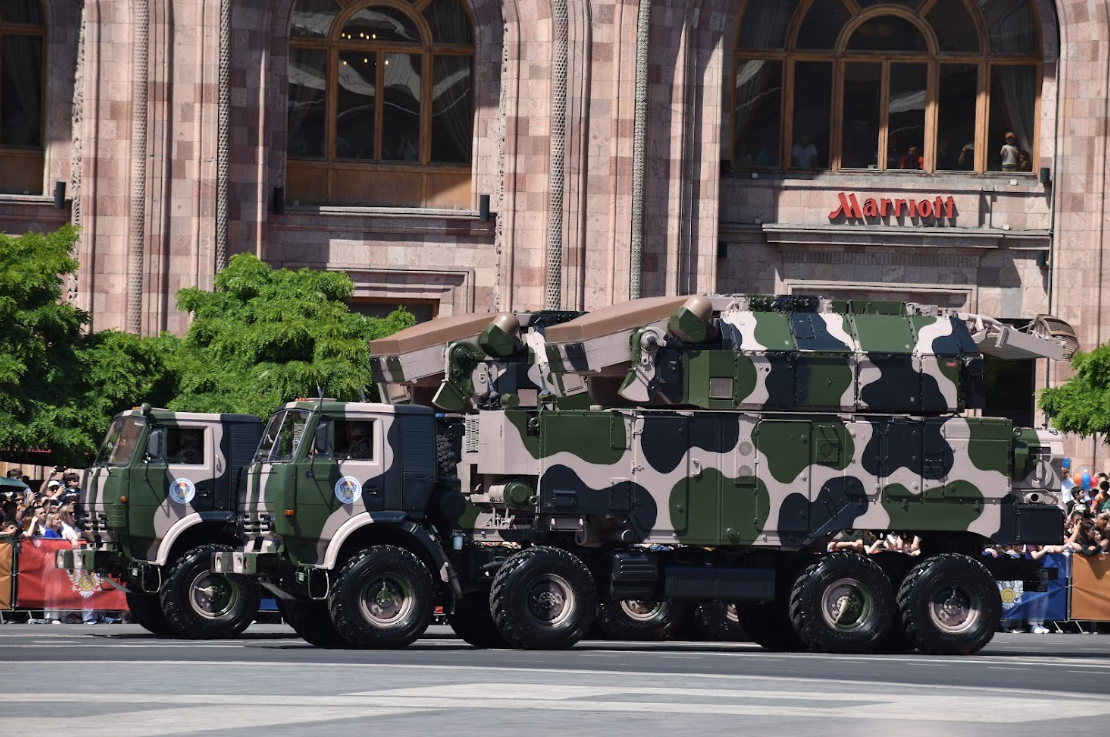
Tor M2KM of the Armenian army

The Tor-M2 km is a self-contained fighting module version of the system that can be mounted in various locations. In October 2016, it was loaded onto the helipad of the Admiral Grigorovich frigate by means of an ordinary wharf crane and fixed in position with steel chains to fire at simulated cruise missiles while the ship was underway. This could give advanced SAM capabilities to vessels without the capacity to install the larger and heavier Kinzhal system; it can also be mounted on a truck, building roof, or any horizontal surface at least 2.5 m wide and 7.1 m long. The module weighs 15 tons and contains all equipment needed to operate without any external support. It can go from standby to full alert in 3 minutes and acquire 144 air targets while simultaneously tracking the 20 most dangerous ones marked for priority by the two-man crew. The Tor-M2 km missiles have a range of 15 km. In June 2022, it was installed on the helipad of the Vasily Bykov patrol boat. The system uses the new 9M331M surface-to-air missiles. According to a Russian source, the system is being installed as of November 2023 on large landing ships of the Black Sea Fleet.

=== Tor-M2DT ===
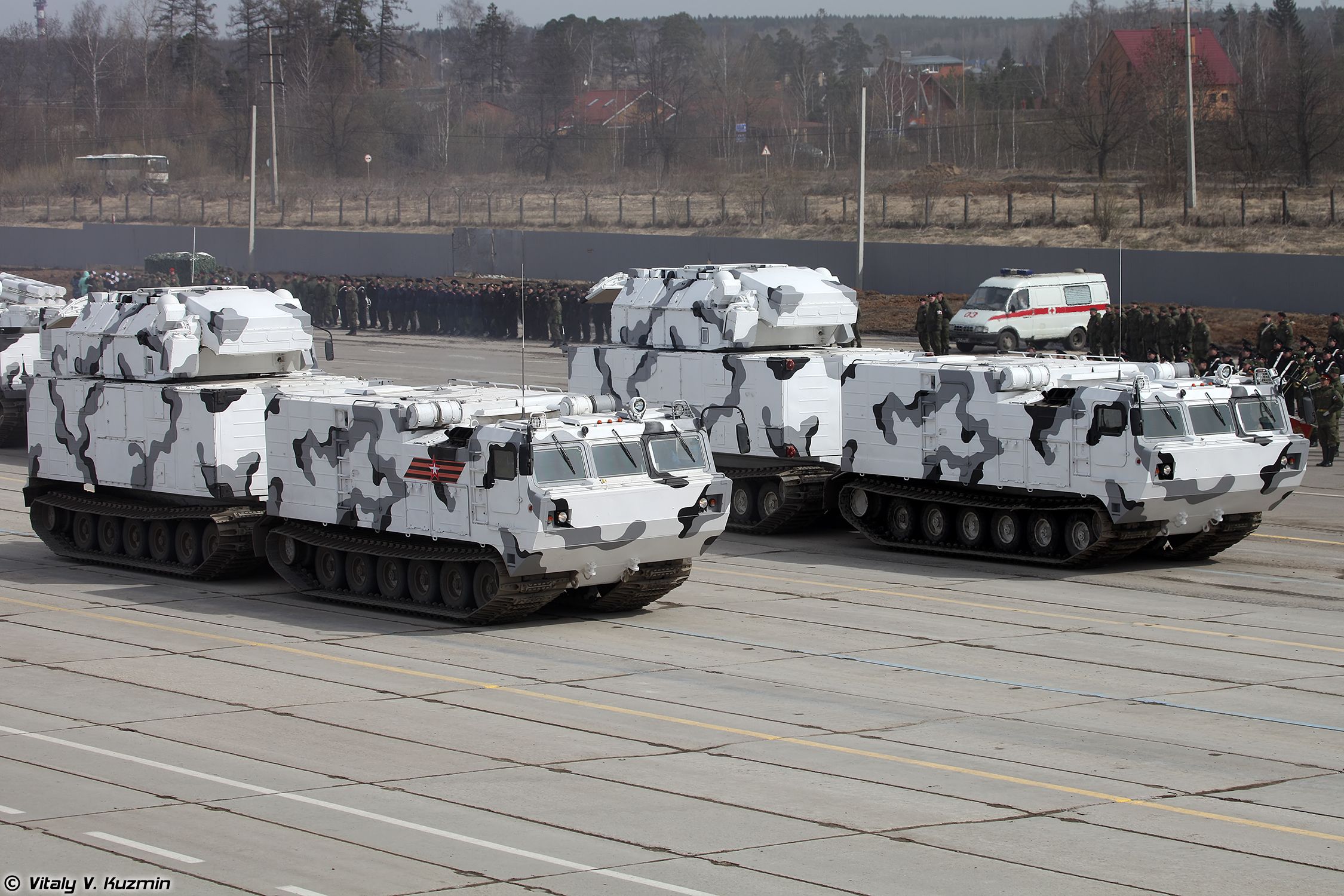
Tor-M2DT, 2017

The system is especially designed to be used for Arctic region at temperatures up to −50 degrees °C based on the chassis of the DT-30PM tracked all-terrain vehicle and is capable of detecting over 40 air targets, especially high-precision weapons, and to track and engage up to four of them simultaneously at a range of up to 12 km and altitudes up to 10 km with its 16 missiles even on the move. Its creation was completed in 2018 and the first delivery of 12 systems was held in November of the same year. It was deployed in Ukraine in December 2022, with at least two systems being destroyed by Ukrainian artillery using M982 Excalibur shells by 3 February 2023 along with a DT-30.

=== Tor-E2 ===
JSC Rosoboronexport, part of the Rostec State Corporation, has started promoting the newest Tor-E2 SAM system developed and produced by the Almaz-Antey Air and Space Defence Concern in 2018. Tor-E2 combat vehicle is an independent, mobile, all-terrain fighting unit that provides detection and identification of air targets on the march and at the halt, target lock-on and engagement at the halt, from a short stop and on the move. A battery of the four-channel Tor-E2 SAM systems, consisting of four combat vehicles, can simultaneously engage up to 16 targets flying from any direction at a range of at least 15 km and an altitude of up to 12 km. Each vehicle carries 16 missiles, twice as many as the previous version of the Tor system. In addition, the two Tor-E2 combat vehicles can operate in the "link" mode, which enables them to exchange information about the air situation at different altitude ranges and coordinate joint engagement operations. In this mode, one of the combat vehicles, acting from an ambush, receives information from the other one and does not reveal itself until the launch of the missile. A command post can be attached to a battery of four Tor-E2 combat vehicles to control and coordinate the Tor combat vehicles and interact with the customer's air defense control system.

=== HQ-17 (Chinese variant) ===
The HQ-17 is a Chinese development of the Tor-M1 system with a new chassis, IFF array, radar, and other electronics.

In 1996, China ordered 14 Tor-M1 missile systems from Russia which were delivered under contract in 1997. In 1999, another contract for 13 Tor-M1 systems was signed between Russia and China. Delivery of the systems took place in 2000.

==== FM-2000 ====
The FM-2000 is a mobile short-range air-defence (SHORAD) system unveiled by China Aerospace Science and Industry Corporation at the 2018 Zhuhai Airshow and in service as of 2019. Its range is 15 km and engagement altitude is 10 km. It is carried on a 3 axle TEL. It is a version of the HQ-17.

=== Dezful (Iranian variant) ===
The Dezful is an Iranian development of the Tor-M1 with upgrades that include installing a new thermal optical camera with the ability to operate day and night and replacing the older analog radio-electronic equipment with digital equivalents. It has a range of 12 km and an altitude of 6 km

== Combat history ==
=== Russo-Georgian War (2008) ===
In a press conference regarding the 2008 Russo-Georgian War, Russian defence ministry spokesperson Anatoliy Nogovitsyn speculated about the use of the Tor missile system by the Georgian Defence Forces against attacking Russian aircraft suggesting it as a possible cause of the loss of a Tu-22MR strategic bomber, shot down by Georgian air-defences while on a reconnaissance mission during the conflict. Following analysis attributed the loss of the bomber to Georgian Buk-M1 system, which Georgia obtained from Ukraine in 2007.

=== Syrian War ===
Since 30 September 2015, Russian military forces have been directly involved in the Syrian Civil War. As part of the air defense, Tor-M2, along with the Pantsir-S1 point air defense system, has been deployed at the Khmeimim Air Base, allegedly, on multiple occasions proving to be superior to the Pantsir-S1 in countering UAV swarm attacks, the vehicles destroyed more than 45 improvised UAVs as of June 2020.

On 9 April 2018, the Israeli Air Force reportedly destroyed a Tor system supplied by Iran along with a drone hangar at Syria's T-4 airbase. The system was not yet operational.

=== Shoot-down of Ukraine International Airlines Flight 752 ===
On 9 January 2020 it was reported by Newsweek that U.S. officials believed Ukraine International Airlines Flight 752 was shot down by an Iranian Tor-M1 missile, probably by accident. Later that day, Canadian Prime Minister Justin Trudeau announced that there was credible allied and Canadian intelligence that an Iranian surface-to-air missile likely caused the loss of the Ukrainian airliner. He would not elaborate further on the intelligence. Eliot Higgins of Bellingcat tweeted photographs of a Tor nose section with its distinctive canards, claimed to be taken at the crash site. On 11 January 2020, Iran admitted that it had shot down the Ukrainian airliner due to human error but Iran didn't close the air space because of war situation, and on 20 January, Iran's Civil Aviation Organization confirmed that "two Tor-M1 missiles [...] were fired at the aircraft."

Worried about an Israeli strike, according to previous military intelligence, similar incidents happened before, with one in particular directly mentioning Iranian Revolutionary Guards Tor-M1 batteries firing a missile toward a civilian airliner by mistake in June 2007.

=== 2020 Nagorno-Karabakh War ===
On 9 November 2020, the Azerbaijan Ministry of Defence published a video showing the destruction of an Armenian Tor-M2 km system in the vicinity of Khojavend. A drone tracked the vehicle as it parked inside a garage where it was subsequently struck by an IAI Harop "kamikaze" drone and multiple guided bombs.

=== Russo-Ukrainian war ===
In 2022, Tor missiles are being used by the Russian armed forces during the Russo-Ukrainian war. Several systems were reportedly abandoned by the Russian army after being stuck in mud, some of them photographed by individuals.

On 29 September 2023, Ukrainian National Police recovered an undisclosed number of TOR missiles from a house in Brovary Raion, Kyiv Oblast. The missiles were believed to have been abandoned by Russian forces when they withdrew from the area in the spring of 2022. According to a Ukrainian official each missile was worth "about 30 million hryvnias (about $811,000)". The missiles were handed over to the Ukrainian Armed Forces.

On 9 November 2023 Ukrainian forces claimed to have destroyed a Tor missile system using a first person view drone on the Kupiansk front.

The Oryx website reports that Russia lost 60 Tor systems of different types during the war up to October 3, 2024. The largest number, 30, is 9K332 Tor-M2 version.

On 31 January 2026, Ukrainian forces claimed to have destroyed a TOR-M1 near the village of Kamianka, Luhansk Oblast.

On 9 April 2026, Ukrainian forces claimed to have destroyed 9 TOR-M1 systems in 9 days

== Operators ==
=== Current ===
- Algeria – Unknown number of M2K systems in service as of 2025
- Armenia – Unknown number of systems in service as of 2025
- Belarus – 21 Tor-M2E and 4 Tor-M2K systems in service as of 2025. Additional systems were delivered in November 2025.
- China – 24 Tor-M1 as of 2025
- Cyprus – 6 Tor-M1 as of 2025
- Egypt – 10 Tor-M1 and 10+ Tor-M2E as of 2025
- Greece – 21 Tor-M1 in service with the Army and 4 with the Air Force as of 2025
- Iran – 29 Tor-M1 systems as of 2025
- Libya – Several seen in a military parade in Benghazi in 2025 (in service of the Libyan National Army).
- Russia – Estimated to have 120+ Tor M1/M2/M2U and 9 Tor M2DT in service as of 2025
- Ukraine – Up to 6 systems in active service as of 2025

=== Former ===
- Artsakh − Seized by Azerbaijan after the 2023 Azerbaijani offensive in Nagorno-Karabakh.
- East Germany Ordered as replacement for 2K21 Kub and 2K11 Krug. None delivered before Reunification.
- Georgia
- India
- Peru
- Soviet Union – Passed on to successor states.

== See also ==
- Pantsir-S1
- Morfey
