= NPO Almaz =

Russian military R&D company

NPO Almaz named after A.A. Raspletin
- Type: Joint stock company
- Industry: radiotechnics
- Founded: 1947
- Headquarters: Moscow, Russia
- Key people: Vitaly Neskorodov, General Director (since February 2011); Pavel Sozinov, General Designer (since February 2011)
- Products: Anti-aircraft defence systems, Missiles
- Revenue: 55,165,100,000 Russian ruble (2017)
- Parent: Almaz-Antey
- Subsidiaries: NIEMI, NIIRP, MNIIRE Altair and MNIIPA scientific & research centers.
- Website: www.raspletin.com

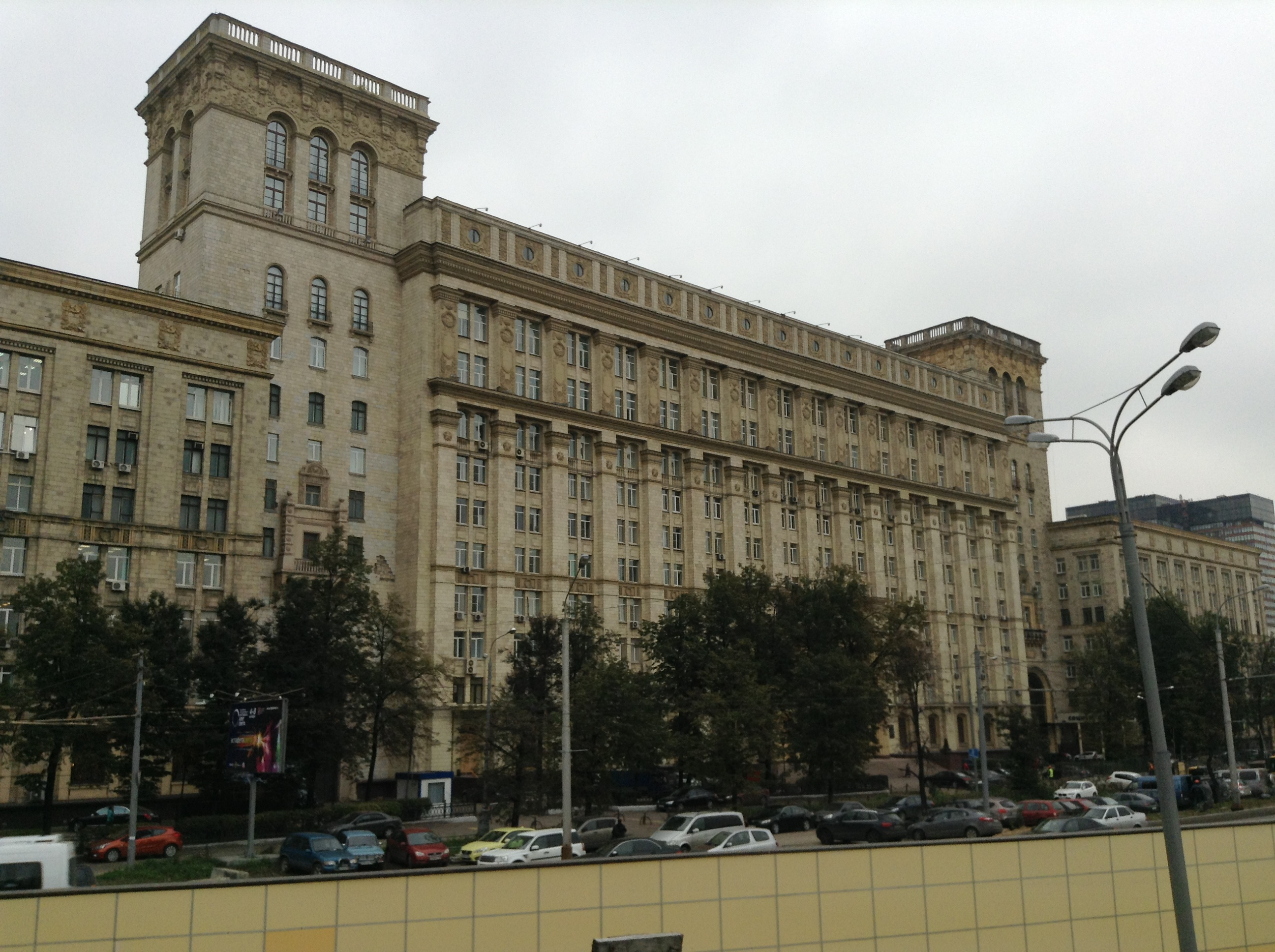
NPO Almaz headquarters in Moscow (built in 1953)

JSC NPO Almaz named after A.A. Raspletin (Russian: ГСКБ Концерна ПВО "Алмаз-Антей", former SB-1, 1947–1950; KB-1, 1950–1966; MKB Strela, 1966–1971; TsKB Almaz, 1971–1988; NPO Almaz, 1988–2008; GSKB Almaz-Antey, 2008–2015) is a Soviet/Russian military R&D enterprise founded in 1947. It is the core of the Almaz-Antey holding. Headquarters – Moscow, Leningradsky av., 80.

== History ==
The company is named after its chief designer Aleksandr Andreyevich Raspletin.

Since 1955, KB-1 developed such air defence missile systems as the S-25 Berkut, S-75 Dvina, S-125 Neva/Pechora, S-200 Angara/Vega/Dubna, S-300, S-400 Triumf, S-300PMU, S-300PMU2, and S-350E Vityaz.

On 30 November 2009, the board of directors of Almaz-Antey voted to reorganize the joint-stock companies NIEMI, NIIRP, MNIIRE Altair and MNIIPA, merging them with NPO Almaz to form GSKB joint venture. GSKB became the head R&D arm of Almaz-Antey holdings, becoming its Head System Design Bureau (Russian: ГСКБ, Головное системное конструкторское бюро).

NIIRP scientific & research center is developing the Joint system of air and ballistic missile defense (Russian: ЕС ЗРО ПВО-ПРО). Earlier, NIIRP successfully developed the A-135 BMD system together with Amur-P multi-channel firing system which were put into operation to protect Moscow on 17 February 1995. NIIRP had previously designed the A-35 and A-35M BMD systems, which defended Moscow from 1977 until the full deployment of the A-135.

In February 2011, it was announced that the first S-500 missile systems should be in serial production by 2014. There will be also a version of the system called S-1000.

== Current product line ==
- Area and object air defence
  S-125 Neva/Pechora
  S-400 Triumf missile system
  S-300PMU2 Favorit missile system
  S-300P missile system and modifications
- Land forces air defence (by NIEMI scientific & research center)
  Antey-2500 missile system
  S-300V missile system
  Tor-M2E short-range missile system
  55Zh6M Nebo M and UME three-band anti-stealth radar
- Ship-based air defence (by MNIIRE Altair scientific & research center)
  Shtil-1 multi-channel ship-based middle-range missile system
  S-300F Rif-M ship-based missile system
  Klinok ship-based missile system
  3M-47 Gibka, naval turret launcher
  Podzagolovok-24E – Basic Collective Mutual Interference Avoidance System (ship-based electromagnetic compatibility electronic equipment)
  Moskit-E, Moskit-MVE missile system
- Automated control systems (by MNIIPA scientific & research center)
  Baikal-1ME
  Krim-KTE
  Universal-1E
  Fundament-2E
