= Almaz-Antey Corporation =

Russian defense and aerospace company

Almaz-Antey
- Native name: Алмаз-Антей
- Type: Open Joint Stock Company
- Industry: Aerospace & Defense
- Founded: 2002; 24 years ago
- Headquarters: 41 Vereyskaya str. Moscow, Russia, 121471
- Key people: Yan Novikov (General Director)
- Products: Anti-aircraft defence systems, Mobile command centers, Guidance systems, Missiles, Anti-ballistic missiles, Cruise missiles, Radars, Automated control systems, Navigation systems, Air traffic systems, Remote weapon stations, Automated turrets, Naval artillery, Artillery shells, Firearms, Ventilation valves, Sewage treatment systems, Unmanned aerial vehicles
- Revenue: $2.24 billion (2015)
- Operating income: $303 million (2015)
- Net income: $461 million (2015)
- Total assets: $7.07 billion (2015)
- Total equity: $1.9 billion (2015)
- Owner: Federal Agency for State Property Management
- Number of employees: 130 000
- Website: www.almaz-antey.ru

JSC Concern VKO "Almaz-Antey" (Russian: ОАО "Концерн ВКО "Алмаз-Антей"») is a Russian state-owned company in the arms industry, a result of a merger of Antey Corporation and NPO Almaz, unifying some of the national military enterprises, in particular, the developers of anti-aircraft defence and cruise missile systems. The organisation is headquartered in Moscow and is the world's eighth-largest defence contractor measured by 2017 defence revenues. In 2017, Almaz-Antey had arms sales of $9.125 billion.

The Almaz-Antey group produce air defense systems, firearms for aircraft and armored vehicles, artillery shells and surface-to-surface missiles, airspace surveillance and coordination and artillery radars. The group also manufacture civilian products such as navigation systems, air traffic systems, civil airtraffic- and weather radars, sewage cleaning systems, ventilation valves for nuclear power plants, and plastic packaging for cosmetics and food products.

== History ==
Almaz-Antey was founded in 2002 by Presidential Decree 412 of the Russian president.

In 2003 the director general of Almaz-Antey, Igor Klimov was shot dead. A criminal investigation found his death was linked to a property audit inside the company.

The current board is headed by Viktor Ivanov.

On 16 July 2014, the Obama administration imposed sanctions through the US Department of Treasury's Office of Foreign Assets Control (OFAC) by adding Almaz-Antey Concern and other entities to the Sectoral Sanctions Identifications List (SSI) in retaliation for the ongoing Ukrainian crisis, annexation of the Crimean Peninsula by the Kremlin, and the Russian interference in Ukraine.

In February 2015 the president of Russia signed a decree to rename JSC Concern PVO "Almaz-Antey" to Concern VKO "Almaz-Antey", and to increase its capitalization. 'PVO' means Protivo-Vozdushnaya Oborona – air defence forces, the Russian name for the Soviet Air Defence Forces branch of the Soviet and Russian military. 'VKO' (or BKO), the Russian Aerospace Defence Forces, was the branch of the Armed Forces of the Russian Federation responsible for air and missile defence, and the operation of Russian military satellites and the Plesetsk Cosmodrome. In August 2015, the Russian Aerospace Forces was created, and includes both the Air Force, and the Aerospace Defence Forces.

In March 2022, as a result of the 2022 Russian invasion of Ukraine, the EU imposed sanctions on Almaz-Antey Corporation.

In September 2025, the company stated that the commissioning of new production facilities allowed it to increase the production of some products by four times. The company also reported that increased the production of S-350 missile system and S-400 air defense system by more than two times over the past year and also mastered the production of new missile weapons.

== Owners and management ==
=== Owners ===
100% of the company's shares are owned by the Russian Federation represented by the Federal Agency for State Property Management.

=== Management body ===
Chairman of the board of directors of the company – M. Fradkov (since November 2016)

General Constructor

- P. Sozinov (since 2013)

Scientific supervisor

- A. I. Savin (2002–2016)
- P. I. Kamnev (2017–2023)
- I. G. Hakobyan (from 2023)

CEO

- Y. Svirin (April 2002-February 2003)
- I. Klimov (February–June 2003, Acting CEO)
- A. Zaitsev (June–August 2003)
- V. Menshchikov (August 2003-March 2014)
- Y. Novikov (from March 2014)

Chairman of the Management Board

- Y. Novikov (since 2015)

== Structure ==
Companies of the holding as of September 2014:

- Moscow Machine Building Plant "Avangard", Moscow
- Avitek, Kirov
- Moscow Scientific-Research Institute "Agat", Zhukovsky, Moscow Oblast
- NPO Almaz, Moscow
- Vektor State Enterprise, Ekaterinburg
- The Order of the Red Labor Banner All-Research institute of Radio equipment, St. Petersburg, Vasilievsky Island
- All-Russian Scientific Research Institute of Radio Engineering, Moscow
- Volzhsky Electromechanical Factory, Republic of Mari El, Volzhsk
- Eastern Defense Enterprise "Granite", Vladivostok
- Obukhov State Plant, St. Petersburg
- The head center of the service maintenance and repair of the Concern of Air defense "Almaz-Antey" "Granite", Moscow
- Dolgoprudnenskoe Scientific Production Plant, Moscow region, Dolgoprudny
- Plant of radio engineering equipment, St. Petersburg
- Design Bureau of Special Machine-Building, St. Petersburg
- Plant of the Red Banner, Ryazan
- Design Bureau Kuntsevo, Moscow
- Izhevsk Electromechanical Plant, Izhevsk
- Lianozovsky Electromechanical Plant, Moscow
- Mari Machine Building Factory, Republic of Mari El, Yoshkar-Ola
- Murom Plant of Radio Measuring Instruments, Vladimir region, Murom
- NIIIP, Novosibirsk
- Tikhomirov Scientific Research Institute of Instrument Design, Moscow Region, Zhukovsky
- Nizhny Novgorod Machine-Building Plant, Nizhny Novgorod
- NPO Novator, Ekaterinburg
- Scientific and production Association Pravdinsky Radio factory, Nizhny Novgorod region, Balakhna
- Pravdinskoye Design Bureau, Nizhny Novgorod region, Balakhna
- RATEP, Moscow region, Serpukhov
- Ryazan industrial- Technical enterprise "Granit", Ryazan
- Kazan experimental Design Bureau Soyuz, Kazan
- Scientific and production Association "Arrow", Tula
- Ulyanovsk Mechanical Plant, Ulyanovsk
- MKB Fakel, Moscow Region, Khimki
- Limited company Responsibility of Almaz-Antey- Story, Moscow
- Limited company Responsibility of Kantey, Moscow
- Almaz-Antey Telecommunications, Moscow
- Almaz-Antey Management consulting, Moscow
- Public corporation "Pulse", Moscow
- Public corporation Radiophysics, Moscow
- Public corporation "Lanthanum", Moscow
- Public joint-stock company MAK Vympel, Moscow
- Russian Institute of Radio navigation and time, St. Petersburg
- Arzamas Instrument-Building Plant, Nizhny Novgorod region, Arzamas
- Public corporation "Saturn", Omsk
- Kalinin Machine-Building Plant, Yekaterinburg
- Scientific and production Enterprise "Plant Iskra", Ulyanovsk
- State Scientific-Research Institute of Instrument engineering, Moscow
- Nizhny Novgorod Research Institute of Radio Engineering, Nizhny Novgorod
- Scientific and Technical Center of Industrial technologies and Air navigation systems, Moscow
- Special Design Bureau "Bearing", Ekaterinburg
- Khabarovsk radio engineering factory, Khabarovsk
- 1015 factory for repair of Military-Technical property, Sverdlovsk Region, Nizhny Sergi
- Manufacturing enterprise «Radar-2633», Moscow Region, Lyubertsy
- 502 factory for repair of mMilitary-Technical property, Noginsk, Moscow region
- 69 repair plant for Rocket-Artillery armament, Kaliningrad
- 1019 military repair plant, Republic of Buryatia, Zaigraevsky district, Onohoy
- 1253 central repair base of radar weapons, Samara
- 3821 factory for military repair, Leningrad Region, Tosno
- Repair plant for radio electronic technique «LUCH», Leningrad Region, Vsevolozhsky district, Village Yanino
- Nizhny Novgorod Plant of the 70th Anniversary of Victory, Nizhny Novgorod
- IEMZ Kupol, makers of the Garpiya UAV

== Products ==
=== Military products ===
The main military products are related to air defense systems.

==== Ground-based air defense ====
Long-range air defense systems to cover settlements and strategic objects: S-300, S-300V4 (export version – Antey-4000), S-400, S-500.

Medium-range air defense systems: S-125 Neva/Pechora, Buk-M2, Buk-M3 anti—aircraft missile systems (export version – "Viking"), S-350 Vityaz.

Short-range mobile air defense systems for direct support of ground forces units: 9K33 Osa, Tor-M1, Tor-M2.

==== Sea-based air defense ====
Rif-M long-range air defense system ("Poliment/Redut").

The Shtil-1 medium-range air defense system.

Short-range air defense systems "Klinok", Gibka.

==== Radar stations ====
Radars for detecting aerial targets: 67N6E, Nebo-IED, Gamma-C1E, Protivnik-GE, Gazetchik-E, Nebo-UE, Kasta-2E2, 1L122E, 96L6E.

Portable radars for detecting ground-based equipment: Fara-PV, Credo-M1.

Artillery reconnaissance radars Aistyonok, Zoopark-1.

==== Automated air defense control systems ====
The automated control systems Baikal-1ME, PPRU-M1-2, Fundament, Universal-1E, Krym-KE (CT), RK-MTZ Valdai are used to control air defense systems and target reconnaissance through their own radars or separate coupled radars.

=== Civil products ===
The main civilian products are related to the conversion of military developments from control systems, topography and radar. Priority sectors in the field of development of civilian products are: medical equipment, communications, transport, housing and communal services, fuel and energy complex.

Telecommunication equipment: Marine and automotive GLONASS navigators.

Air traffic control radar: Lira-A10, Utes-T, Aurora.

Automated air traffic control systems: Vega, Topaz, Sintez.

According to Defense News, revenues from the concern's civilian products are insignificant, but this may be due to the dual purpose of technology and taking into account such equipment as military.

In 2021, the concern announced the development of its own electric car under the working name E-NEVA. The crossover will also be presented as a hybrid powered by hydrogen or natural gas. Its maximum speed will be 197 km/h, mileage on a single charge – 463 km.

== See also ==
- Rosoboronexport
- Rostec
- Sozvezdie
- Titan-Barrikady
- Uralvagonzavod
