= Polyana-D4 =

Soviet/Russian command and control system

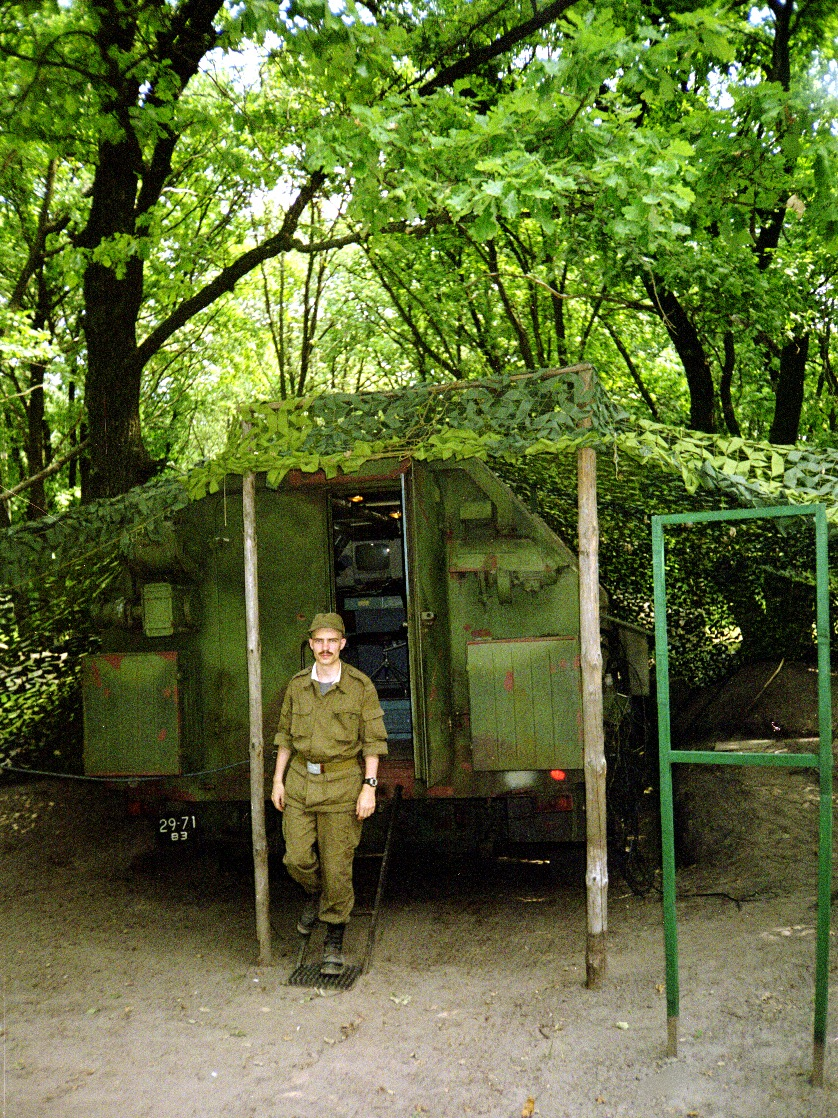
Vehicle MP06

9S52 Polyana-D4 ASU (Russian: АСУ зенитной бригады 9С52 «Поляна-Д4» English: Meadow) is a Soviet/Russian automated command and control system for air defence troops. May act as an upper level command post (CP) of the SAM brigade including S-300V as well as the 9K37 Buk complex. And also other means, including aircraft.

Developed by Scientific Research Institute of the automatisation technics of Minradioprom. Chief designer - G.A.Burlakov. Development works started under the Decisions of the Special Commission of the Presidium of the USSR Soviet Ministry on military-industrial questions dated June 29, 1977 and August 27, 1981.

Mass production of the system organized at the Minsk Electromechanical Plant (currently GNPO Agat), but later transferred to Penza, former Minradioprom factory.

In service since 1986.

Polyana-D4 is a substantial remake of 9S468M1 Polyana-D1, development by NIIAA.

== Structure ==
- PBU (translit. Punkt Boevogo Upravleniya) of the brigade (vehicle MP06)
- Commanding-staff vehicle (KShM) of the brigade (vehicle MP02 with a trailer CP4)
- spare parts and technical service vehicle (MP45)
- two diesel electrostations ED-T400-1RAM

PBU (MP06M of Polyana-D4M) is based on a BAZ-6950 chassis.

KShM (MP02M of Polyana-D4M) is based on a Ural-375 chassis.

== Modifications ==
- 9S52M D4M Polyana system produced by Belarusian GNPO Agat, also developers of the Buk-MB modernisation of Buk-M1.
- 9S52M4 Polyana-D4M4

== Operators ==
- Algeria (2014)
- Russia
- Syria (2018)

=== Former operators ===
- Soviet Union

== See also ==
- 9S468M1 Polyana-D1
- Ranzhir-M
