= PPRU =

- Pirate Party of Russia
- Policy Planning and Research Unit (UK)
- Personnel Policy Research Unit
- Packaging and Polymer Research Unit
- Pediatric Pharmacology Research Unit (US NIH)
- PPRU-1 is a Soviet/Russian mobile air target reconnaissance and command center
