= DKBA =

DKBA may refer to:

- the Democratic Karen Buddhist Army, an insurgent group that operated in Myanmar from 1994 to 2010
- the Democratic Karen Buddhist Army - Brigade 5 (DKBA-5), an insurgent group that is active in Myanmar
- the Dolgoprudniy Design Bureau of Automatics (formerly abbreviated as DKBA (Russian: ДКБА), near Moscow, balloons and airships manufacturer, descendant of part of the Dolgoprudnenskoe Scientific Production Plant
