= List of NATO reporting names for surface-to-air missiles =

NATO reporting name corresponding to US DoD SA series surface-to-air missiles, with Soviet designations or Chinese designations:

To differentiate Russian missiles from similarly named Chinese ones, RS prefix was added to the US DoD reporting name. For example, SA-N-7 became RS-SA-N-7.

== Soviet Union ==
- SA-1 Guild (S-25 Berkut)
- SA-2 Guideline (S-75 Dvina/Volkhov/Desna)
- SA-3 Goa (S-125 Nyeva)
- SA-4 Ganef (2K11 Krug)
- SA-5 Gammon (S-200 Volga)
- SA-6 Gainful (2K12 Kub/Kvadrat)
- SA-7 Grail (9K32 Strela-2)
- SA-8 Gecko (9K33 Osa)
- SA-9 Gaskin (9K31 Strela-1)
- SA-10 Grumble (S-300P/PS/PT)
- SA-11 Gadfly (9K37 Buk)
- SA-12 Gladiator/Giant (S-300V)
- SA-13 Gopher (9K35 Strela-10)
- SA-14 Gremlin (9K36 Strela-3)
- SA-15 Gauntlet (9K330/9K331/9K332 Tor)
- SA-16 Gimlet (9K310 Igla-1)
- SA-17 Grizzly (9K37 Buk-M1-2)
- SA-18 Grouse (9K38 Igla)
- SA-19 Grison (2K22 Tunguska)
- SA-20 Gargoyle (S-300PMU-1/2 Favorit)
- SA-21 Growler (S-400 Triumf)
- SA-22 Greyhound (Pantsir-S1)
- SA-23 Gladiator/Giant (S-300VM "Antey-2500")
- SA-24 Grinch (9K338 Igla-S)
- SA-X-25 9M337 Sosna-R
- SA-26 Pechora-2M
- SA-27 Gollum Buk missile system (Buk-M3)
- SA-X-28 S-350E Vityaz 50R6
- SA-29 Gizmo 9K333 Verba

While multirole anti air systems were given the SA prefix, an exception was made for dedicated surface-to-air Anti-Ballistic missiles, which were given the designation of ABM:

- ABM-1 Galosh (A-350)
- ABM-3 Gazelle (53T6)
- ABM-4 Gorgon (A-135)

U.S. DoD designations for SA-N series naval surface-to-air missiles, with Soviet designations. Note that these are not standard NATO names, NATO uses the regular SA series for naval SAMS also, however the US DoD refers to them by these names:

- SA-N-1 Goa (4К90 Volna) [SA-3]
- SA-N-2 Guideline (М-2 Volkhov-M) [SA-2]
- SA-N-3 Goblet (4K60/4K65 Shtorm)
- SA-N-4 Gecko (9M33 Osa-M) [SA-8]
- SA-N-5 Grail (9K32 Strela-2) [SA-7]
- SA-N-6 Grumble (S-300F Fort) [SA-10]
- SA-N-7 Gadfly (9M38/9M38M Uragan) [SA-11]
- SA-N-8 Gremlin (9K34 Strela-3) [SA-14]
- SA-N-9 Gauntlet (3K95 Kinzhal) [SA-15]
- SA-N-10 Grouse (3M38 Igla) [SA-18]
- SA-N-11 Grison (3M87 Kashtan) [SA-19]
- SA-N-12 Grizzly (3K37 Smerch/Shtil) [SA-17]
- SA-N-14 Grouse (9K38 Igla) [SA-18]
- SA-N-20 Gargoyle (S-300FM) [SA-20]

== China ==
=== Anti-air ===
- CH-SA-1 (HQ-2)
- CH-SA-3 (HN-5)
- CH-SA-4 (HQ-7)
- CH-SA-6 (HQ-6)
- CH-SA-7 (QW-1)
- CH-SA-8 (QW-2)
- CH-SA-9 (HQ-9)
- CH-SA-10 (FN-6)
- CH-SA-11 (QW-18)
- CH-SA-12 (HQ-12)
- CH-SA-13 (TY-90)
- CH-SA-14 (FN-16)
- CH-SA-15 (HQ-17)
- CH-SA-16 (HQ-16)
- CH-SA-20 (HQ-22)
- CH-SA-21 (HQ-9B)
- CH-SA-N-4 (HHQ-7)
- CH-SA-N-9 (HHQ-9)
- CH-SA-N-16 (HHQ-16)
- CH-SA-N-17 (HHQ-10)
- CH-SA-N-21 (HHQ-9B)

=== Anti-ballistic ===
- CH-AB-1 (DF-11 interceptor)
- CH-AB-2 (HQ-19)

== See also ==
- NATO reporting name
