= Dolgoprudnenskoe Scientific Production Plant =

Russian surface-to-air missile manufacturer

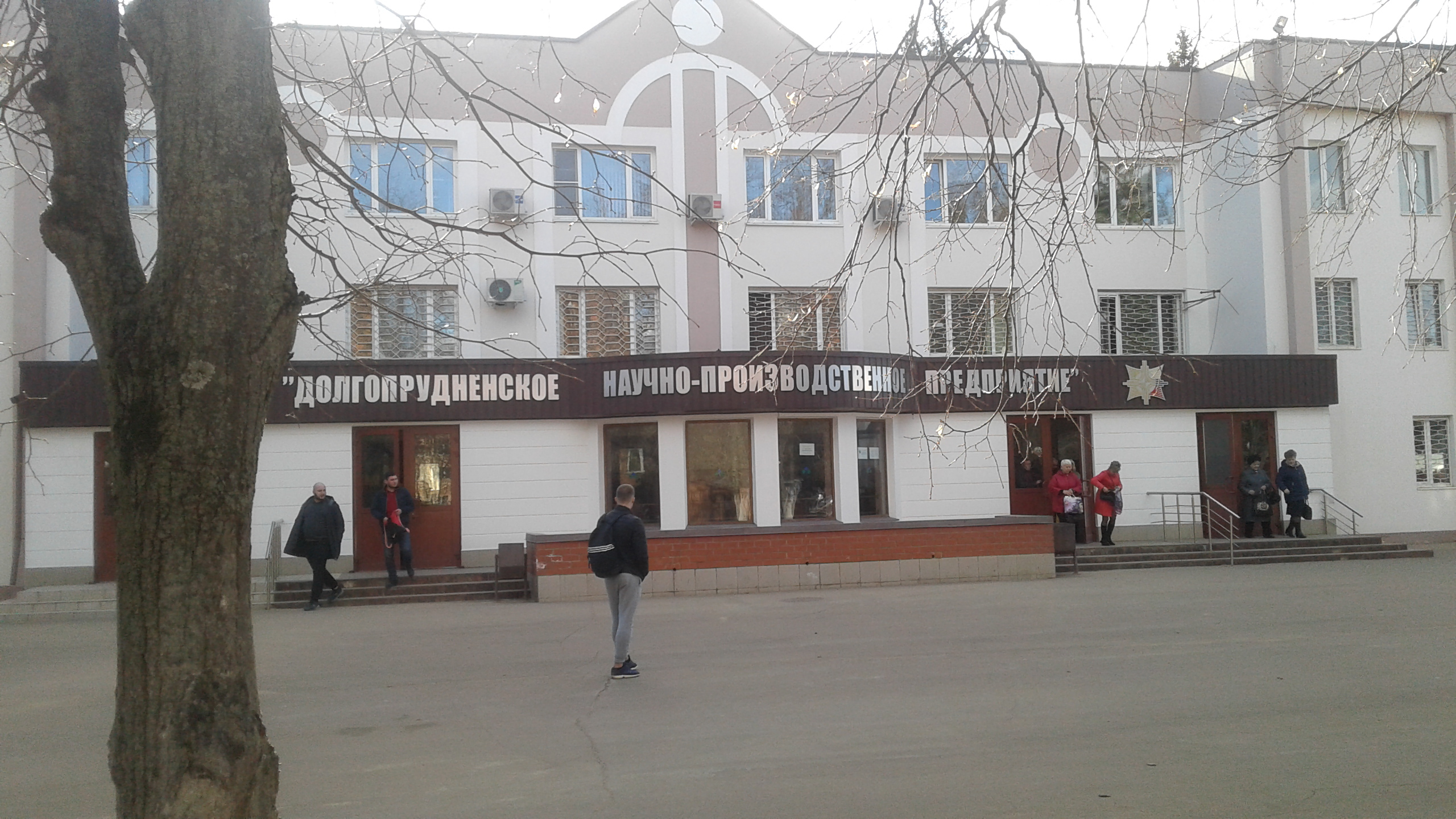
- Main entrance checkpoint
- Type: joint-stock company
- Industry: aerospace
- Founded: 1932
- Headquarters: Dolgoprudny, Russia
- Key people: Gennady Ezhov, general director and Vasily Ektov, chief designer
- Revenue: $161 million (2015)
- Parent: Almaz-Antey
- Website: dnpp.biz

OJSC Dolgoprudnenskoye Scientific Production Plant (also translated as Dolgoprudny Research Production Enterprise, Russian: Долгопрудненское научно-производственное предприятие) or DNPP for short is a Soviet/Russian designer and mass producer of surface-to-air missiles located in the city of Dolgoprudny, Moscow Oblast.

Currently, it's producing SAMs for land-based air defence systems (Buk-M1-2 for example) and its naval version (Shtil-1). It also develops and produces devices for the automatic launching and flight control of the missiles.

It is served by a branch line of the Moscow - Savyolovo railway with frequent cargo trains departing Mark station bound to and from the factory.

== History ==
Founded at the end of 1931 inside the structure of Chief Department of Glavvozdukhflot under the name of Dirigiblestroy for the means of producing the dirigibles.

In 1951 it changed the name to Dolgoprudny Machine-building Plant (Russian: Долгопрудненский машиностроительный завод or DMZ.

At that time the first SAMs were designed and produced. Since 1960 DNPP is specializing in air defence system.

In 1992 enterprise finished public offering of its shares.

Since 2002 DNPP joined Almaz-Antey (49.34% shares of DNPP to Almaz-Antey).

== Production ==
The missile 9M38M1 for the 9K37M1 Buk-M1 was designed by the DNPP. Its peak velocity is Mach 3.5. The 9K37M1-2 Buk-M1-2 (SA-17) combines this missile and the newer 9M317, also designed at DNPP.

== Owners ==
JSC Concern VKO "Almaz-Antey" — 56.7976 % of shares

== Notable employees ==
Vasily Ektov, Chief designer (1995—2013)
