= PPRU-1 =

Soviet/Russian mobile reconnaissance and command center (MRCC)

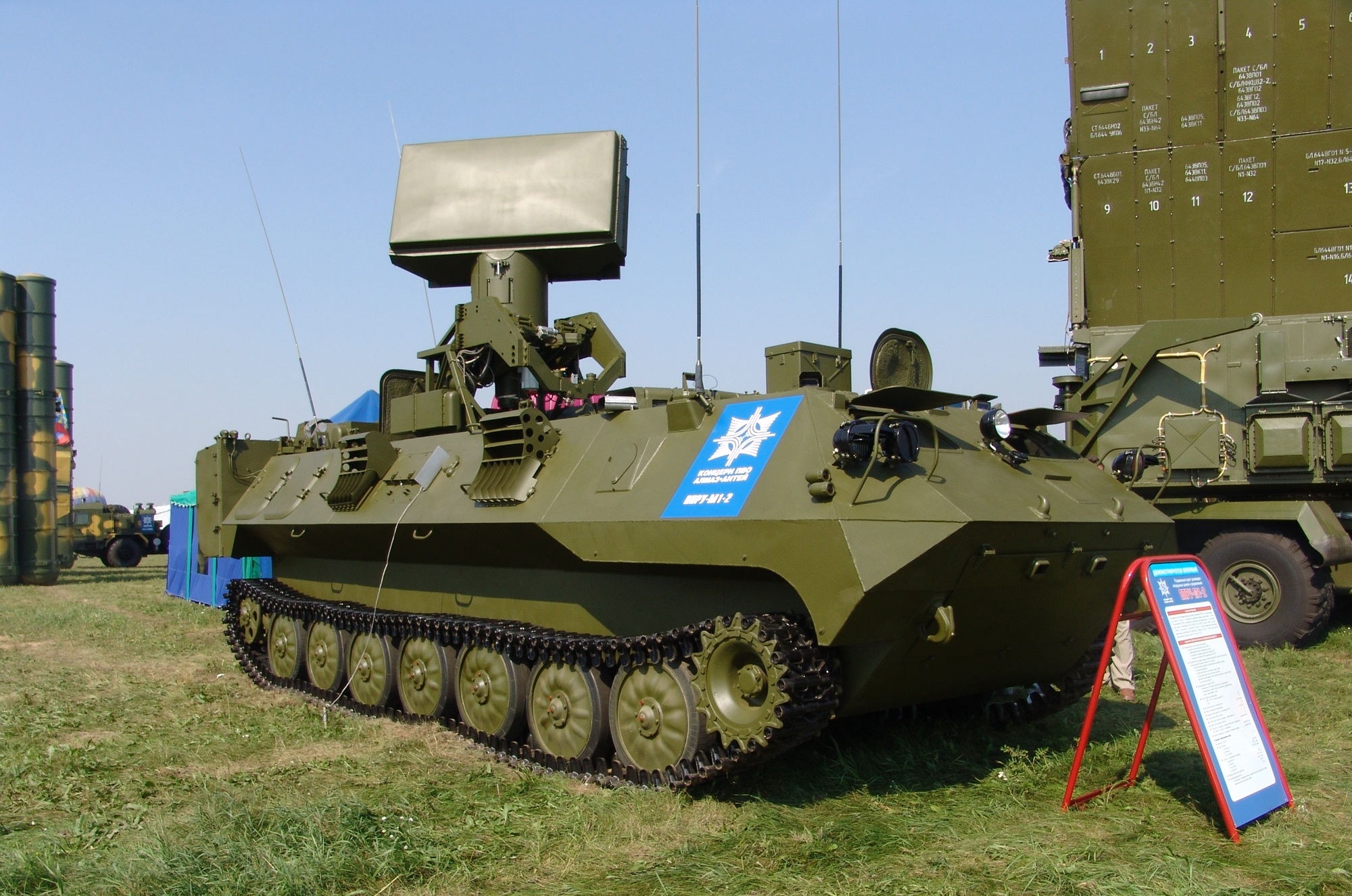
A mobile air target reconnaissance and command center (MRCC) PPRU-M1-2 at the 2007 MAKS Airshow

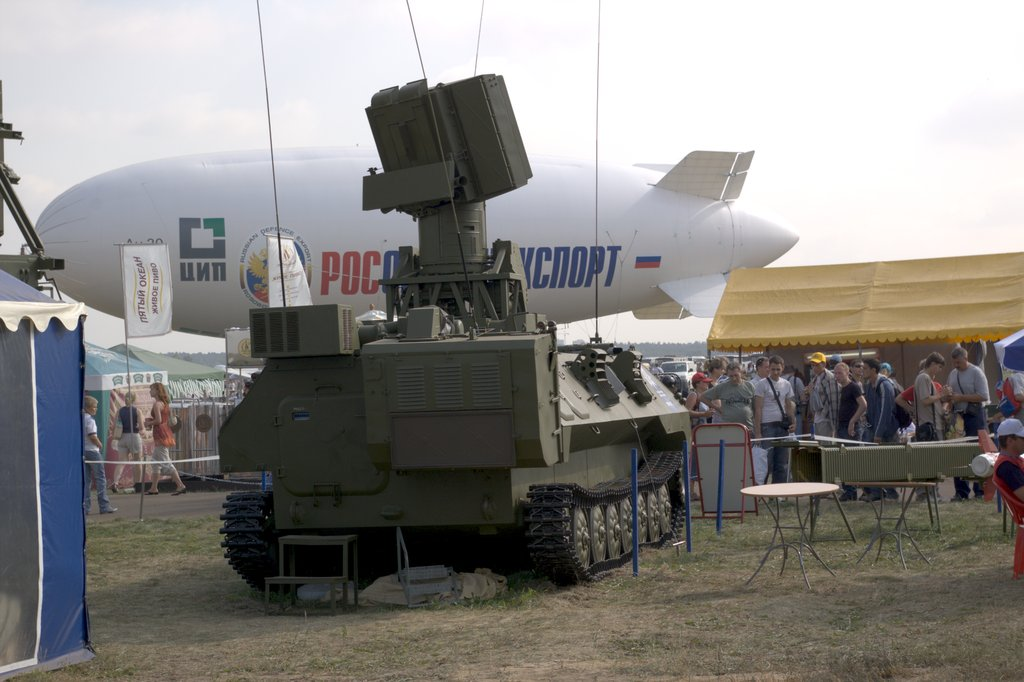
Backside of MRCC PPRU-M1-2 at the 2007 MAKS Airshow

PPRU-1 "Ovod-M-SV" (Russian: ППРУ-1 «Овод-М-СВ», GRAU designation - 9S80, NATO reporting name - Dog Ear, English: Ovod) is a Soviet/Russian mobile reconnaissance and command center for tactical air defence systems.

== Description ==
PPRU-M1 and PPRU-M1-2 could link up to 3 air defense missile or artillery batteries. It integrates under unified command and control up to 4 vehicles of Tor-M1 (Tor-M2E) or Osa-AKM missile systems, up to 6 vehicles of Tunguska-М1, Strela-10M2 (Strela-10M3) or ZSU-23-4M4 or ZSU-23-4M5, up to 6 guns of ZU-23/-30M1-4, up to 6 sections of Igla and Strela MANPADs and 1 battery of 57-mm S-60 (6–8 anti-aircraft guns).

== Modifications ==
- 9S80-1 Sborka (PPRU-1M)
- 9S80M Sborka-M
- 9S80M1 Sborka-M1 (PPRU-M1)
- 9S80M1-2 Sborka-M1-2 (PPRU-M1-2)

== See also ==
- Ranzhir
