= Ranzhir =

Russian mobile command center

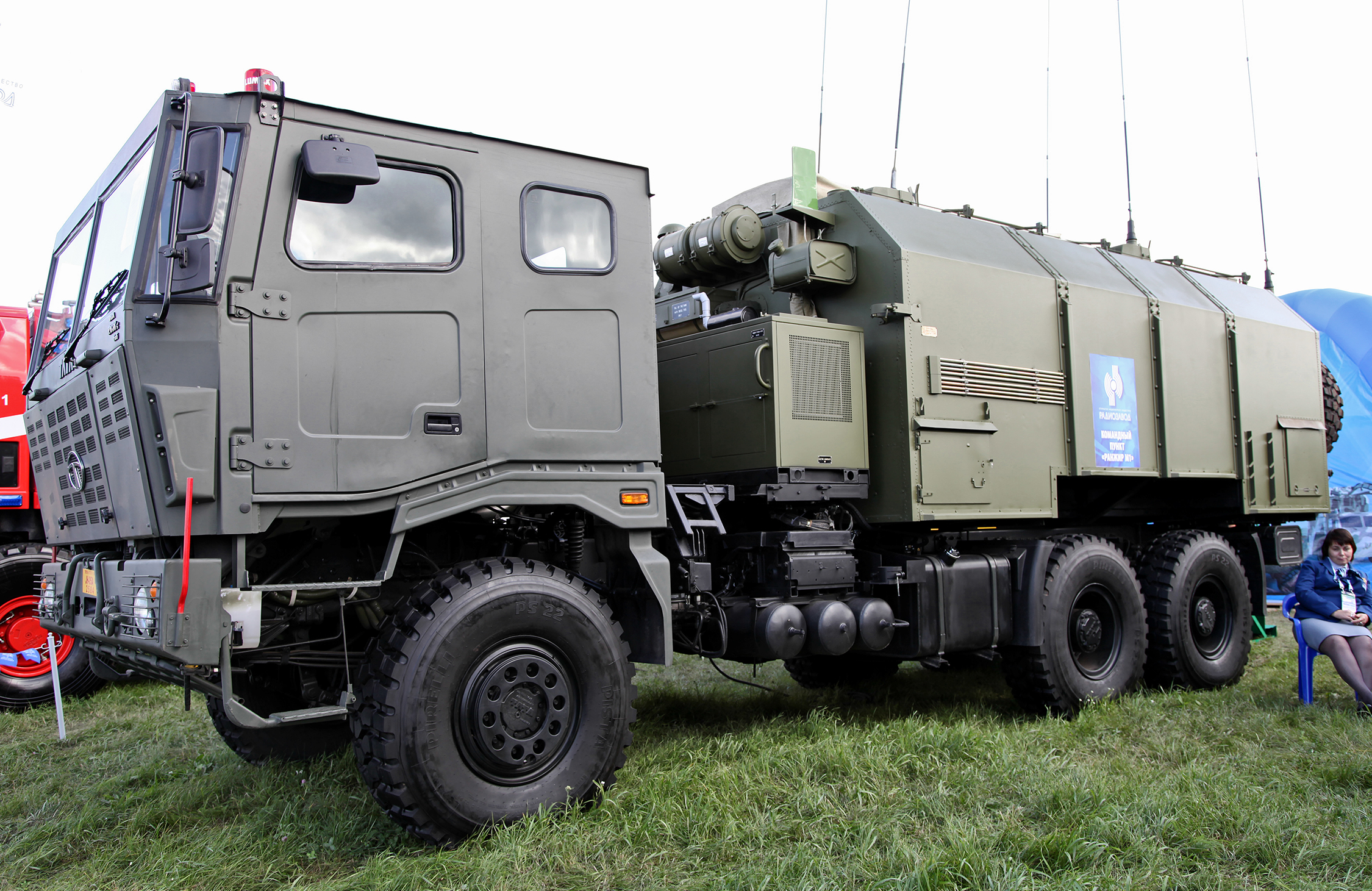
Ranzhir-M1 unified command post on TATA chassis

Ranzhir (Russian: Ранжир, GRAU designation 9S737 (Russian: 9С737); English: ranking) is a Soviet/Russian mobile command center for several types of Russian anti-aircraft weapons, such as Tor, Tunguska, Strela-10, Igla and Osa.

It is used for a mixed grouping of air defense forces.

== Development ==
9S737 vehicle was designed by Belarusian scientific and research institute of automatization technologies (NIISA), currently "AGAT–Control Systems". A. V. Shershnev was appointed chief designer of 9S737 vehicle.

State trials of the system were held from August 1987 till June 1988 at Embi testing range (nowadays at Kazakhstan). In 1989 it was approved for military.

Mass production was started at Minsk NPO Agat, but later transferred to Radiozavod (Penza)

== Modifications ==
- 9S737М Ranzhir-M (Russian: Ранжир-М)

== See also ==
- PPRU-1
