= 2T Stalker =

- Type: Stealth Armored Reconnaissance Vehicle
- Place of origin: Belarus

Service history
- In service: prototype
- Used by: Belarusian Army

Production history
- Designed: 2000
- Manufacturer: Minotor Service Enterprise
- Produced: 2009 (first prototype)
- No. built: 2

Specifications
- Mass: 27.4 tons
- Length: 7.770 meters
- Width: 3.386 meters
- Height: 2.510 meters
- Crew: 3+2 (+ 1)
- Main armament: 30 mm automatic cannon 2A42 (500 rounds); 1 x AGS-17 30 mm grenade launcher (166 rounds)
- Secondary armament: 1 x 7.62 mm machine gun (2000 rounds); 2 x 4 9K114 Shturm anti-tank missiles 2 x 9K38 Igla anti-aircraft missiles
- Engine: diesel engine 740 hp (550 kW)
- Power/weight: 24.5 hp/metric ton
- Transmission: Allison DDA X-1100-3B
- Suspension: hydropneumatic
- Operational range: 1000 km
- Maximum speed: Road: 95 km/h

The 2T Stalker, also known as BM-2T Stalker, is a Belarusian armored vehicle. It was based on the GM chassis and never entered production .

== Armament ==
=== Fire Control System ===
The vehicle incorporates a multi-channel day/night optical electronic suite.

=== Weapons ===
The weapon set of the 2T Stalker comprises a stabilized 30 mm caliber automatic cannon, a coaxial machine gun, an automatic grenade launcher, as well as four ready-fire missiles; two anti-aircraft and two anti-tank missiles.

==== Main and coaxial guns ====
The 2T Stalker comprises a 30 mm automatic cannon 2A42 as the main armament, as announced in 2001. The gas-operated gun is a dual feed multipurpose small caliber weapon, that has a dual rate of fire with a minimum rate of 200-300 or 550 rounds per minute (rds/min), where the rapid fire mode assures 800 rds/min. The sustained rate of fire is 200 rds/min, though. The gun is intended for engaging materiel, low flying aircraft, light vehicles, and dismounted infantry. With a muzzle velocity of 960 m/s, the gun is capable of defeating a light Armored Personnel Carrier at a range of 1,500 meters, a soft-skinned vehicle at 4,000 meters, and slow-flying aircraft at altitudes up to 2,000 meters and slant ranges of up to 2,500 meters.

The vehicle mounts a 7.62mm PKT in the coaxial gun position.

==== Grenade launcher ====
The AGS-17 Plamya (Russian: Пламя) is a Soviet-designed automatic grenade launcher currently in production in the Russian Federation. The AG-17 weapon system uses VOG-17M fragmentation rounds with a non-delay point fuse detonating on impact, designed to engage soft targets in cover. The weapon is fed from a box-stowed, metal linked belt holding 166 rounds.

==== Retractable launchers ====
The Stalker mounts two retractable launchers that each carry two ready-to-fire missiles, with an additional six reloads stored in the hull. Typically, the left side carries ATGMs while the right carries light anti-aircraft missiles.

===== Anti-Tank Missiles (AT-6 Spiral) =====
The 9K114 Shturm (NATO reporting name is AT-6 SPIRAL) is a tube-launched, SACLOS antitank guided missile. The missile has replaced the older 3M11 Falanga (AT-2 Swatter) on the Mi-24 Hind attack helicopter, yet the SACLOS system with IR missile tracking, and radio guidance, similar to the uprated version of the Swatter, the AT-2c, operates the same as the AT-4 Spigot and AT-5 Spandrel which unlike the AT-6 Spiral are wire-guided. The AT-6 is said to be a laser-guided missile based on/ version of the American Hellfire missile, however, that is as incorrect as the erroneous crediting of the missile with 7,000-10,000 meters as the maximum range. The AT-6 missile is a 130mm caliber tube launched, Semi-Automatic Command to Line-Of-Sight (SACLOS) Anti-Tank Guided Missile (ATGM) that can engage targets within 400–5,000 meters. The conventional shaped-charge warhead of the basic Shturm is believed to ba capable of penetrating 560-600mm of armor, where the warhead that contains two tandem HEAT charges would punch through 600–700 mm of rolled homogenous steel armor (RHA).

===== Anti-Air missiles (SA-18 Grouse) =====
The 9K38 Igla (NATO reporting name is S-18 Grouse) is a 72.2 mm man-portable air defense missile weighing 10.6 kilograms with a 1.3 kilogram warhead. The missile itself is 1.67 meters long, the container is 1.708 meters and the whole system weights 17 kilograms. The system is designed to engage fixed-wing and rotary-wing aircraft, cruise missiles and UAVs flying at speeds of 360–400 m/s in head-on engagement (approaching target) and up to 320 m/s in tail chase (receding target) within their optical visibility and in the night-time conditions in background clutter and thermal countermeasures environment. The system uses thermal battery/gas bottle, and is armed with a high-explosive warhead fitted with a contact and grazing fuse. The missile has a maximum range of 5200 meters and operates at altitudes from ten and up to 3500 meters. The 9M39 missile SA-18 employs an IR (infrared) guidance system using proportional convergence logic. The new seeker offers better protection against electro-optical jammers; the probability of kill against an unprotected fighter is estimated at 30-48%, and the use of IRCM jammers only degrades this to 24-30%.

== Comparable vehicles ==
=== Infantry Fighting Vehicles ===
- Mitsubishi Type 89 IFV – (Japan)
- BMP-3 – (Soviet Union, Russia)
- K21 – (South Korea)
- Puma – (Germany)
- A3 Bradley – (United States)
- Egyptian Infantry Fighting Vehicle – (Egypt)

== See also ==
- Armored warfare
- Reconnaissance vehicle
