= 2K12 Kub =

2K12 "Kub" NATO reporting name: SA-6 "Gainful"
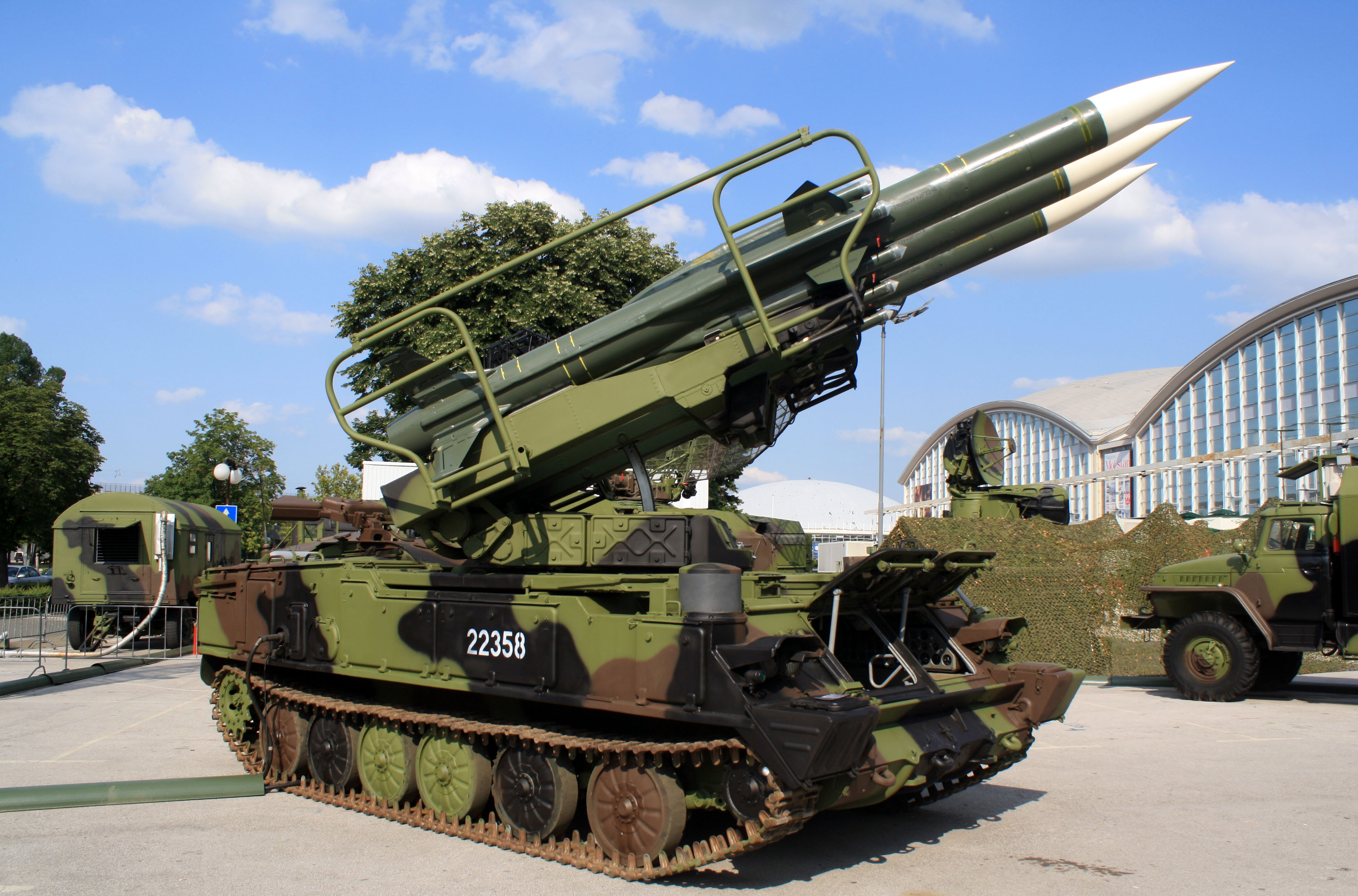
- 2P25 TEL with missiles elevated (2K12 Kub SAM of Serbian 250th Air Defence Missile Brigade)
- Type: Tracked medium-range surface-to-air missile system
- Place of origin: Soviet Union

Service history
- In service: 1967–present
- Used by: See list of operators
- Wars: List: Yom Kippur War; Angolan Civil War; Chadian Civil War; Western Sahara War; Iran–Iraq War; 1982 Lebanon War; Gulf War; Yugoslav wars; Kosovo War; Syrian Civil War; Russo-Ukrainian War; Russian invasion of Ukraine; Yemeni Civil War (2014–present); 2020 Nagorno-Karabakh war

Production history
- Designer: NIIP/Vympel; MMZ (GM chassis)
- Designed: 1958–1967
- Manufacturer: Ulyanovsk Mechanical Plant (SURNs); ZiK (TELs)
- Produced: 1968–1985
- No. built: 500 launchers, 10,000 missiles
- Variants: 2K12 Kub, 2K12E Kvadrat (export version), 2K12M3, 2K12M4

Specifications (2K12 Kub)
- Main armament: 3 3M9M4(or variants) guided missiles
- Engine: Integral rocket motor/ramjet booster and sustainer motor
- Guidance system: Command guidance with terminal semi-active radar homing (SARH)

The 2K12 "Kub" (Russian: 2К12 Куб; English: 'cube') (NATO reporting name: SA-6 "Gainful") mobile surface-to-air missile system is a Soviet low to medium-level air defence system designed to protect ground forces from air attack. 2К12 is the GRAU designation of the system.

Each 2K12 battery consists of a number of similar tracked vehicles, one of which carries the 1S91 (SURN vehicle, NATO designation "Straight Flush") 25 kW G/H band radar (with a range of 75 km (47 mi)) equipped with a continuous wave illuminator, in addition to an optical sight. The battery usually also includes four triple-missile transporter erector launchers (TELs), and four trucks, each carrying three spare missiles and a crane. The TEL is based on a GM-578 chassis, while the 1S91 radar vehicle is based on a GM-568 chassis, all developed and produced by Russian manufacturer MMZ.

== Development ==
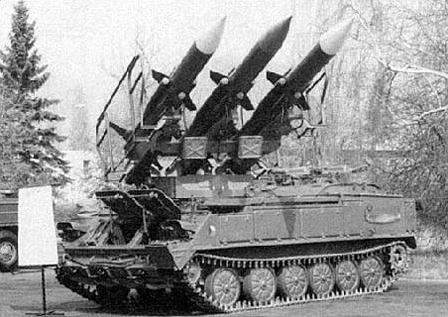
2P25 TEL with missiles erected

The development of the 2K12 started after 18 July 1958 at the request of the CPSU Central Committee. The system was set the requirements of being able to engage aerial targets flying at speeds of 420 to 600 m/s (820–1,200 kn) at altitudes of 100 to 7,000 m (330 to 23,000 ft) at ranges up to 20 km (12 mi), with a single shot kill probability of at least 0.7.

The systems design was the responsibility of the now Tikhomirov Scientific Research Institute of Instrument Design (NIIP). In addition to NIIP several other design bureaus were involved in the creation of the Kub missile system including Mytishchi Machine-Building Plant which designed and produced the chassis of the self-propelled components. Many of the design bureaus would later go on to co-operate in the development of the successor to the 2K12 "Kub", the 9K37 "Buk".

First trials of the missile system were started at the end of 1959 to discover a series of problems:

- low power for the missile radar seeker and badly designed nose cone
- missile air inlets design failure
- low quality of heat shield inside the afterburner chamber (titanium was replaced by steel).

In August 1961 Toropov was replaced by Lyapin as the Chief Designer of Vympel and in January 1962 Tikhomirov was replaced by Figurovskiy as the Chief Designer of NIIP. Still, the work was not intensified. Before 1963 only 11 of 83 missiles fired had the seeker head installed; only 3 launches were successful.

Kub downed its first-ever air target on 18 February 1963, during the state trials at Donguz test site, Orenburg Oblast. It was an Ilyushin Il-28 bomber.

The system entered an extended testing period between 1959 and 1966, after overcoming the technical difficulties of producing the 2K12 "Kub" the system was accepted into service on 23 January 1967 and went into production that same year.

It is sometimes claimed that the M-11 Shtorm naval system is a version of the 3M9 but this is not the case, as the M-11 Shtorm is a separate system and, unusually for Russian surface-to-air missiles, has no land-based variant.

Kub
Kub-M1
Kub-M3
Kub-M4
Buk

Kvadrat
Kub-M

The 2K12 "Kub" was recommended for modernisation work in 1967 with the goal of improving combat characteristics (longer range, improved ECCM, reliability and reaction time) established for the new chief designer Ardalion Rastov. A modernised variant underwent trial testing in 1972 eventually being adopted in 1973 as the "Kub-M1". The system underwent another modernisation between 1974 and 1976, again the general combat characteristics of the system were improved with the "Kub-M3" clearing testing and entering service in 1976.

After the Rastov visit to Egypt in 1971 to see Kub in operation he decided upon the development of a new system, called Buk, where each TEL should have its own fire control radar (TELAR) and is able to engage multiple targets from multiple directions at the same time.

The final major development of the Kub missile system was achieved during the development of its successor, the 9K37 "Buk" in 1974. Although the Buk is the successor to Kub it was decided that both systems could share some interoperability, the result of this decision was the "Kub-M4" system. The Kub-M4 used Kub-M3 components which could receive fire control information from the 9А310 transporter erector launcher and radar (TELAR) of the 9K37 Buk. The advantage of interoperability was an increase in the number of fire control channels and available missiles for each system as well as a faster service entry for Buk system components. The Kub-M4 was adopted into service in 1978 following completion of trials.

External images
- Photo of one of the Buk prototype, based on Kub components
- Photo of one of the Buk prototype, based on Kub components (sideview)

Some early development implementations of the Buk missile system heavily utilized Kub components, including the 3M9 missile.

There are several plans to integrate active radar homing missiles into Kub. For instance, Polish WZU of Grudziądz demonstrated a project of a Sparrow-armed Kub at the MSPO 2008 defence exhibition in Kielce. It is reported also that Vympel initiated some work to use its RVV-AE air-to-air missile to modernise the Kvadrat SAM system.

Also, the Czech company RETIA presented a SURN (fire control radar) upgrade featuring an optical channel and new multiple-function color displays as well as the radar upgrade and the IFF system.

In 2011 a Kub upgraded launcher (named "2K12 KUB CZ") with three Aspide 2000 missiles in launch containers was presented at the International Exhibition of Defence and Security Technologies (IDET) exposition in Brno. The modifications were made by Retia.

== Description ==
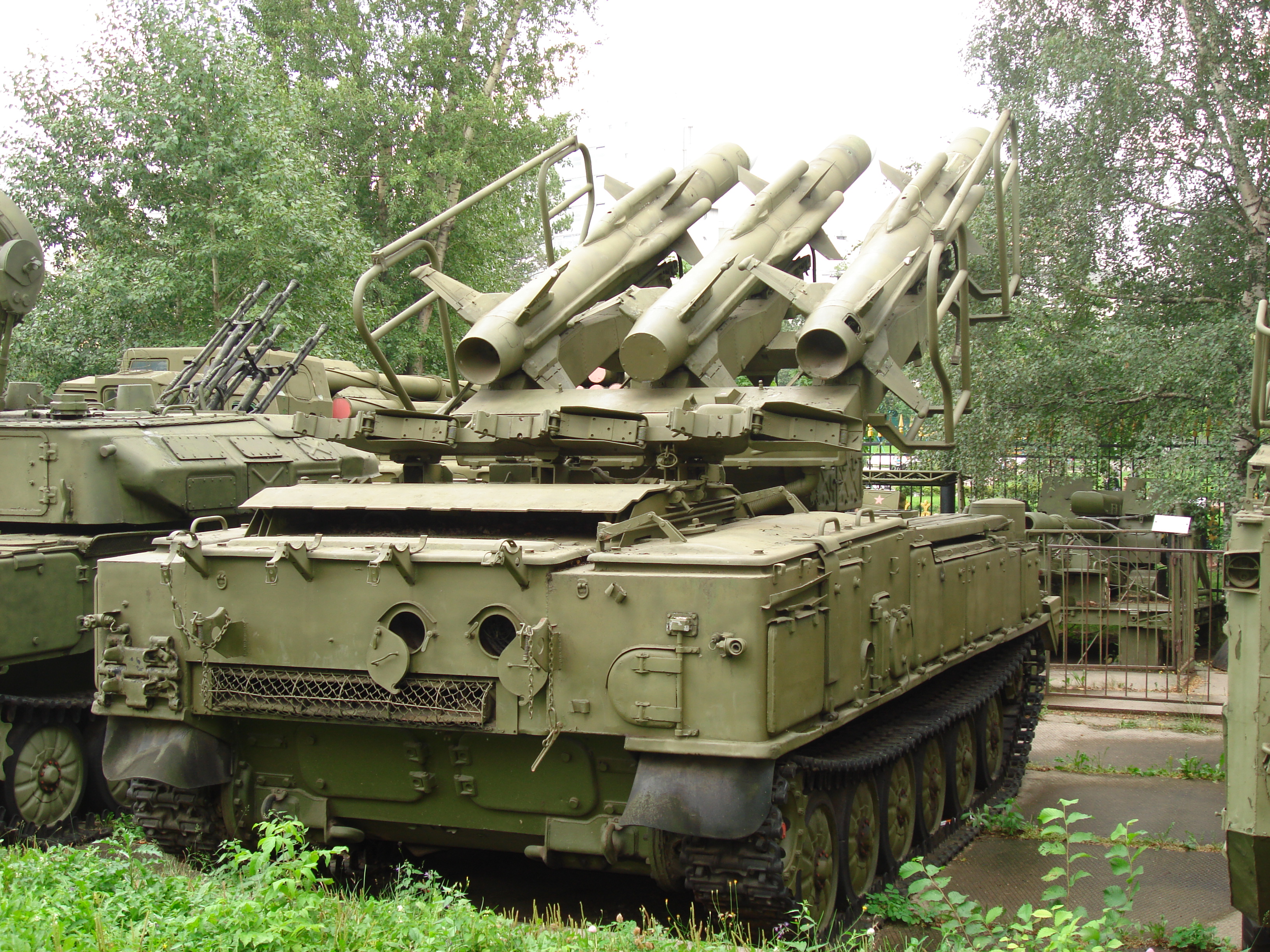
Rear view of the Kub at the Central Museum of Russian Armed Forces

The 2K12 system shares many components with the 2K11 Krug (SA-4) system. In many ways they are designed to complement each other; 2K11 is effective at long ranges and high altitudes, 2K12 at medium ranges and intermediate altitudes.

The system is able to acquire and begin tracking targets using the 1S91 "Самоходная установка разведки и наведения" (SPRGU - "Self-propelled Reconnaissance and Guidance Unit" / NATO: "Straight Flush" radar) at 75 km (47 mi) and begin illumination and guidance at 28 km (17 mi). IFF is also performed using this radar. It can only guide one or two missiles to a single target at any time. The missile is initially command guided with terminal semi-active radar homing (SARH), with target illumination provided by the "Straight Flush" radar. Detonation is via either the impact or proximity fuze. On the latest models, this vehicle is also fitted with an optical tracking system which allows engagement without the use of the radar (for active RF emissions stealth reasons, or due to heavy ECM jamming) in which case the effective altitude is limited to 14 km/46000 ft. The optical tracking method also allows engagements to altitudes below that where the radar is able to track targets. Maximum target speed is around Mach 2 for head-on engagements and Mach 1 for tail-chase engagements. Top speed of the missile is approximately Mach 2.8.

In contrast to the elaborate Patriot missile or even the simpler Hawk system fielded by US forces, most of the system rides on two tracked self-propelled vehicles, rather than towed or mounted on trucks, and either the launcher or control vehicle can be set to launch in only 15 minutes after changing location.

3M9
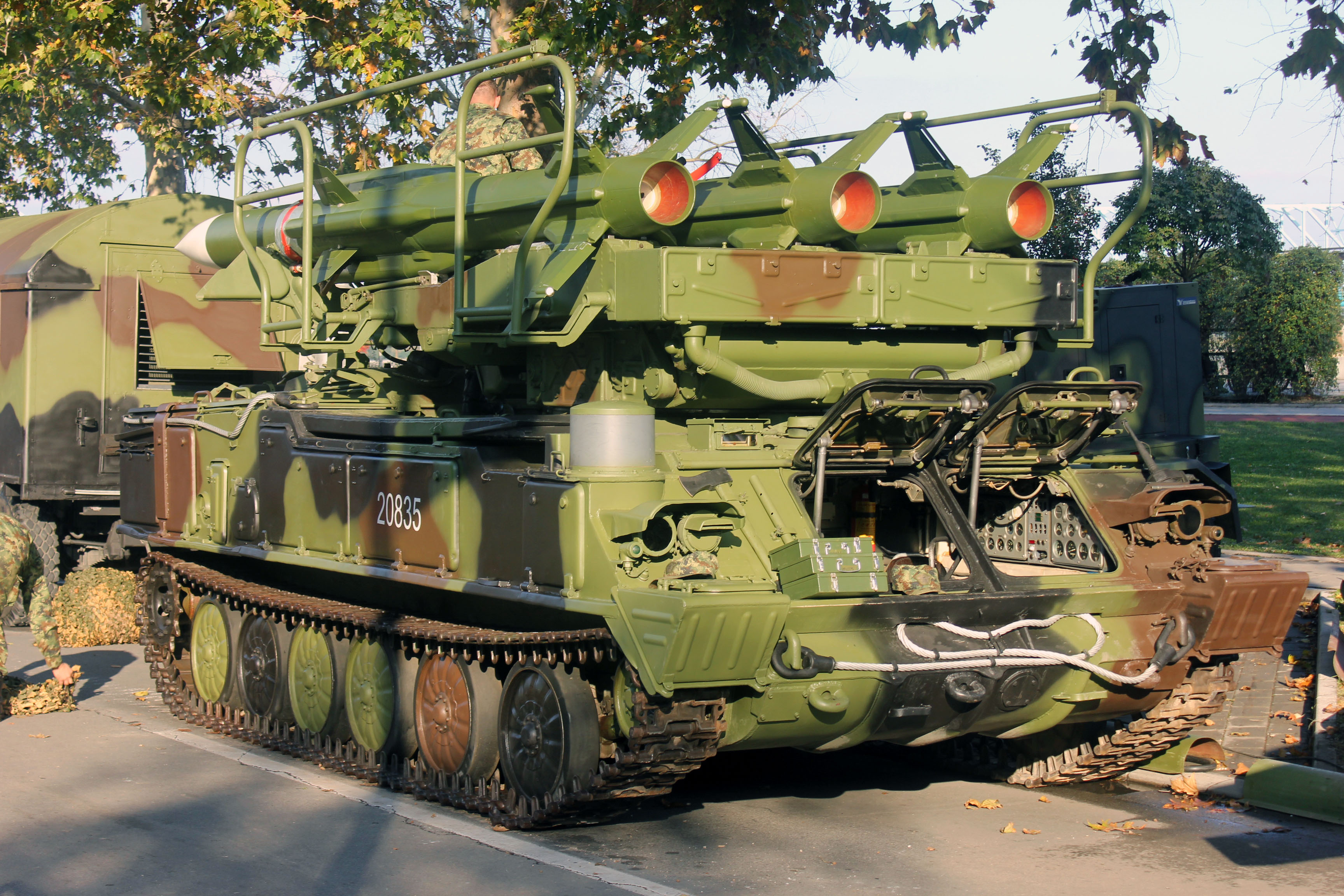
- Type: Surface-to-air missile
- Place of origin: Soviet Union

Production history
- Variants: 3M9, 3M9M1, 3M9M3, 3M9M4

Specifications (3M9)
- Mass: 599 kg
- Length: 5,800 mm
- Diameter: 335 mm
- Wingspan: 1.245 m
- Warhead: Frag-HE
- Warhead weight: 59 kg
- Detonation mechanism: Contact and proximity
- Propellant: integral rocket motor/ramjet booster and sustainer motor
- Operational range: 24 kilometres (15 mi)
- Flight altitude: Max. 14,000 metres (46,000 ft); Min. 100 metres (330 ft)
- Maximum speed: Mach 2.8
- Guidance system: semi-active radar homing
- Launch platform: 2P25 TEL

=== Missiles ===
IVC 3M20M3 Peniye
- Type: Surface-to-air missile training target imitator system
- Place of origin: Soviet Union/Russia

Specifications
- Mass: 600 kg
- Length: 5,841 mm
- Wingspan: 932 mm
- Warhead: no
- Propellant: integral rocket motor/ramjet booster and sustainer motor
- Operational range: 24 kilometres (15 mi)
- Flight altitude: 500–6,000 metres (1,600–19,700 ft)
- Maximum speed: 200–600 m/s
- Guidance system: semi-active radar homing
- Launch platform: 2P25 TEL

The fairly large missiles have an effective range of 4–24 km (2.5–14.9 mi) and an effective altitude of 50–14,000 m (160–45,930 ft). The missile weighs 599 kg (1,321 lb) and the warhead weighs 56 kg (123 lb). Top missile speed is approx. Mach 2.8. The combined propulsion system 9D16K included solid fuel rocket motor which, when burned out, forms the combustion chamber for a ramjet in a pioneering design putting this missile far ahead of its contemporaries in terms of propulsion.

The missile was fitted with a semi-active radar seeker 1SB4, designed by MNII Agat, which was able to track the target by Doppler frequency since the start. Later upgrades (3M9M3 missile) could do this before the start. Chief Designer of the seeker head was Yu.N. Vekhov, since 1960 – I.G. Akopyan.

In 1977 a new version, the 3M9M1 (DoD designation SA-6B) was created with three missiles fitted onto a different chassis (the same as that of the 9K37 "Buk" (NATO reporting name "Gadfly" / DoD SA-11 ), the 2K12 effective replacement) with an integrated "Fire Dome" missile guidance radar. For comparisons between the 2K12, 9K37, see the 9K37 Buk entry.

An earlier incremental upgrade saw the 2K12 missiles replaced with the 2K12E versions and this system was known as Kvadrat ("Квадрат", meaning square). This name was derived from the most common arrangement pattern of the military vehicles of the 2K12 complex, when the 1S91 radar is located at the center and 4x2P25 TELs at the vertices of a square around the radar.

=== Comparison ===
Complex (GRAU designation)	Kub	Kub-M1	Kub-M3	Kub-M4 (Buk-M1)
Introduced	1967	1973	1976	1978
Missiles per TEL	3	3	3	3
Engagement range	6–22 km	4–23 km	4–25 km	4–24 km
Engagement altitude	100–7,000 m	80–8,000 m	20–8,000 m	30–14,000 m
Missile speed (Mach)	1.75	1.75	2	2
Maximum target speed (Mach)	1.75	1.75	1.75	1.75
Response Time (seconds)	26–28	22–24	22–24	24
missile Weight, kg	630 kg	630 kg	630 kg	630 kg
Simultaneous engagements	1	1	1	2
Deployment time (minutes)	5	5	5	5

=== 1S91 radar ===
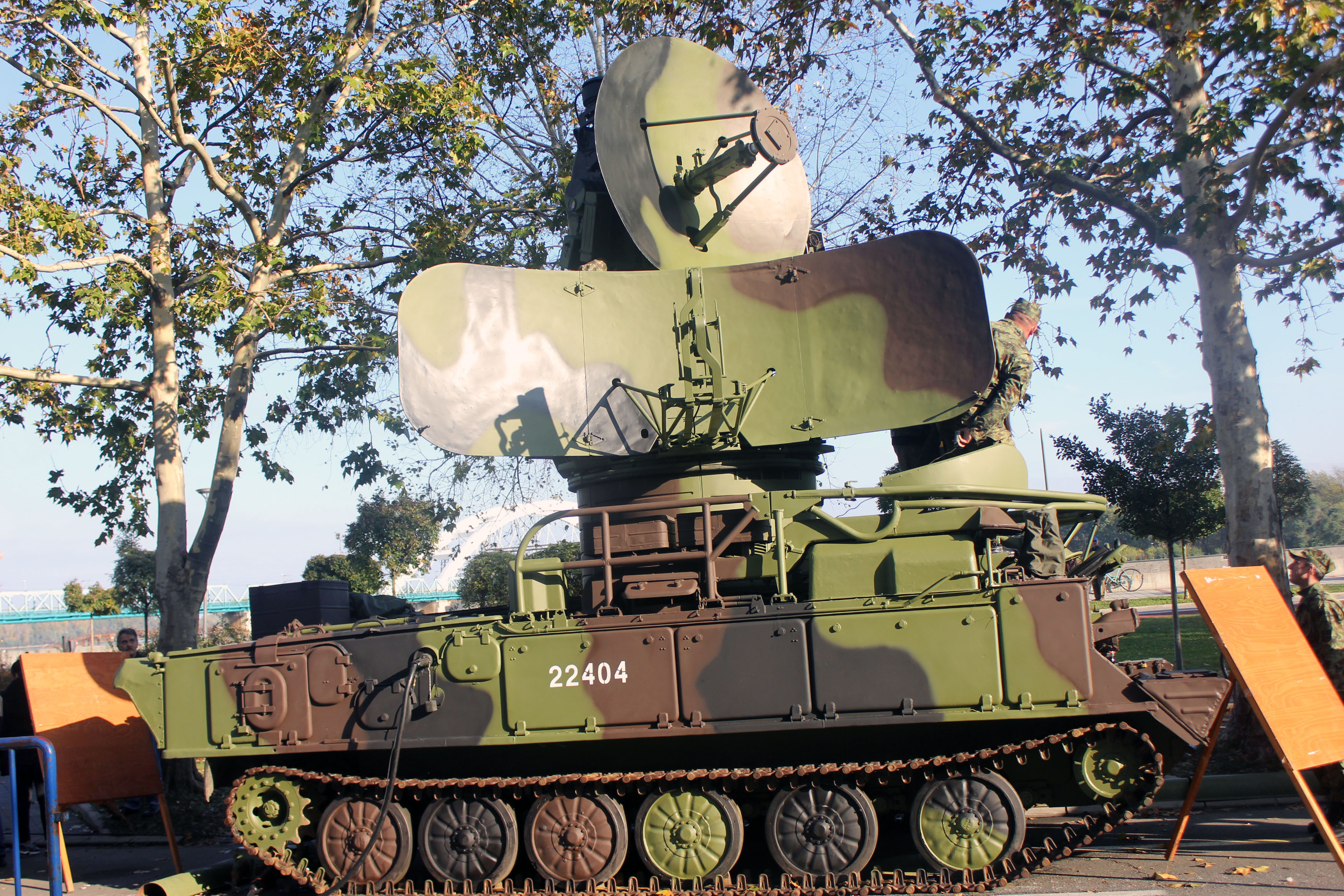
Radiolocator of 2K12 KUB

SURN 1S91 vehicle included two radar station – a target acquisition and distribution radar 1S11 and a continuous wave illuminator 1S31, in addition to an IFF interrogator and an optical channel.

While 1S31 antenna was installed on the upper section of the superstructure and the 1S11 on the lower, they could turn around independently. To make the height of the vehicle lower the central cylinder was able to hide inside the prime mover.

The acquisition range of the radar was reported as 50 km (31 mi) for an F-4 Phantom II type of target.

Total weight of the 1S91 vehicle with a crew of 4 was 20.3 tonnes and 2P25 vehicle with 3 missiles and a crew of 3 was 19.5 t.

=== Additional radar ===
The 2K12 can also be used at a regimental level, if used as such it can be accompanied by a number of additional radar systems for extended air search at longer range and lower altitude, to supplement the 1S91 "Straight Flush". These systems include the:

- P-12 "Spoon Rest", a VHF early warning radar (also used by the S-75 Dvina), with a 200 kilometres (120 mi) range.
- P-40 "Long Track", an E band early warning radar (also used by the 2K11 Krug and 9K33 Osa), with a 370 kilometres (230 mi) range.
- P-15 "Flat Face A", a UHF early warning radar (also used by the S-125 Neva, with a 150 kilometres (93 mi) range.
- PRV-9 ("Thin Skin"), PRV-11 ("Side Net") or PRV-16 E band height finding radar (also used by the S-75, 2K11 Krug and S-200, range 240 km (150 mi)
- NRS-22 ("Score Board") IFF radar

The P-12 and PRV are mounted on a truck, P-40 on a tracked vehicle (a modified AT-T) and P-15 on a van. The NRS-22 IFF radar is mounted on a free standing tripod.

Without the P-40 "Long Track" mobile radar vehicle, the 2K12 is unable to track aircraft at high altitudes.

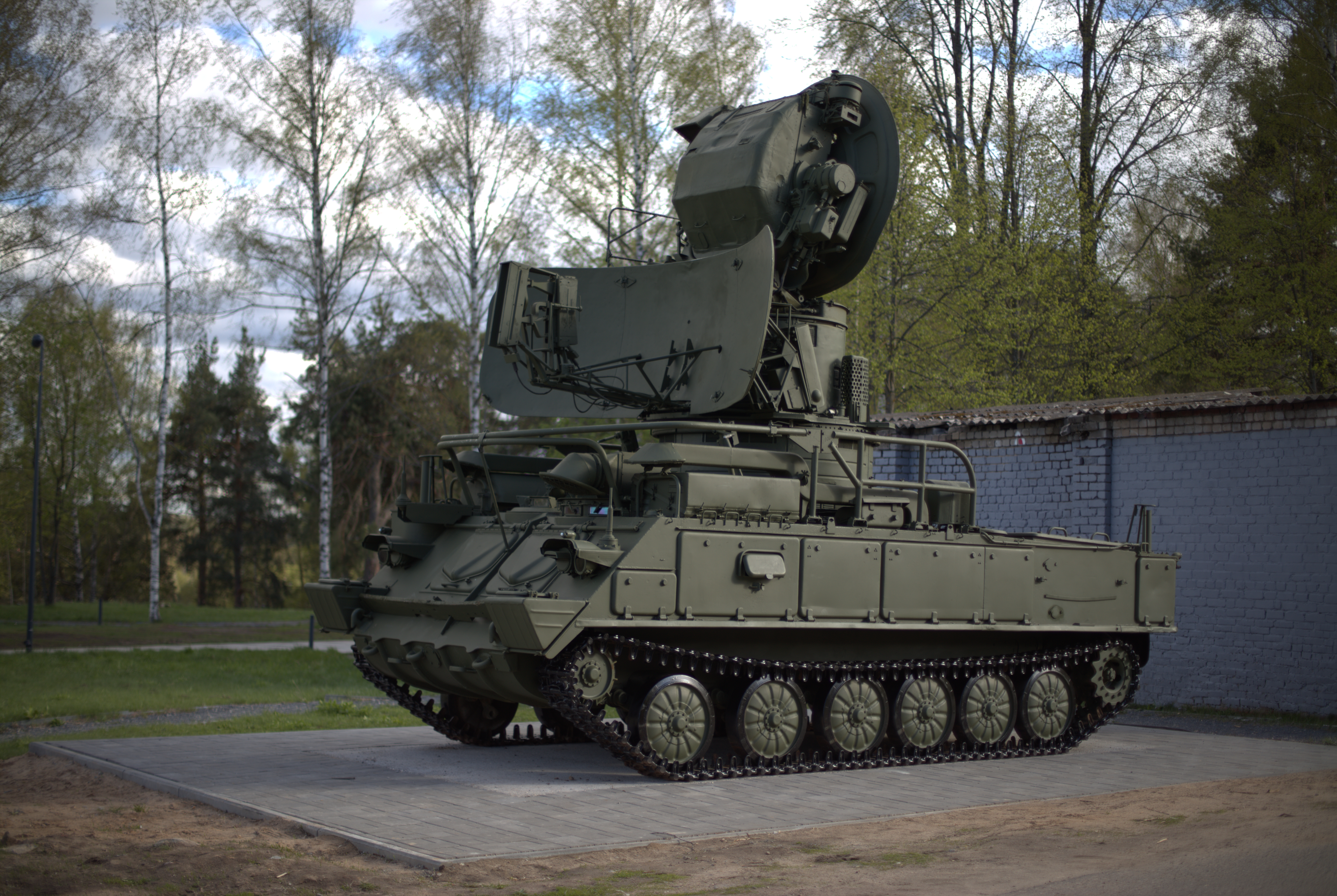
1S91 (or SURN) vehicle in an open-air military museum, Kineshma

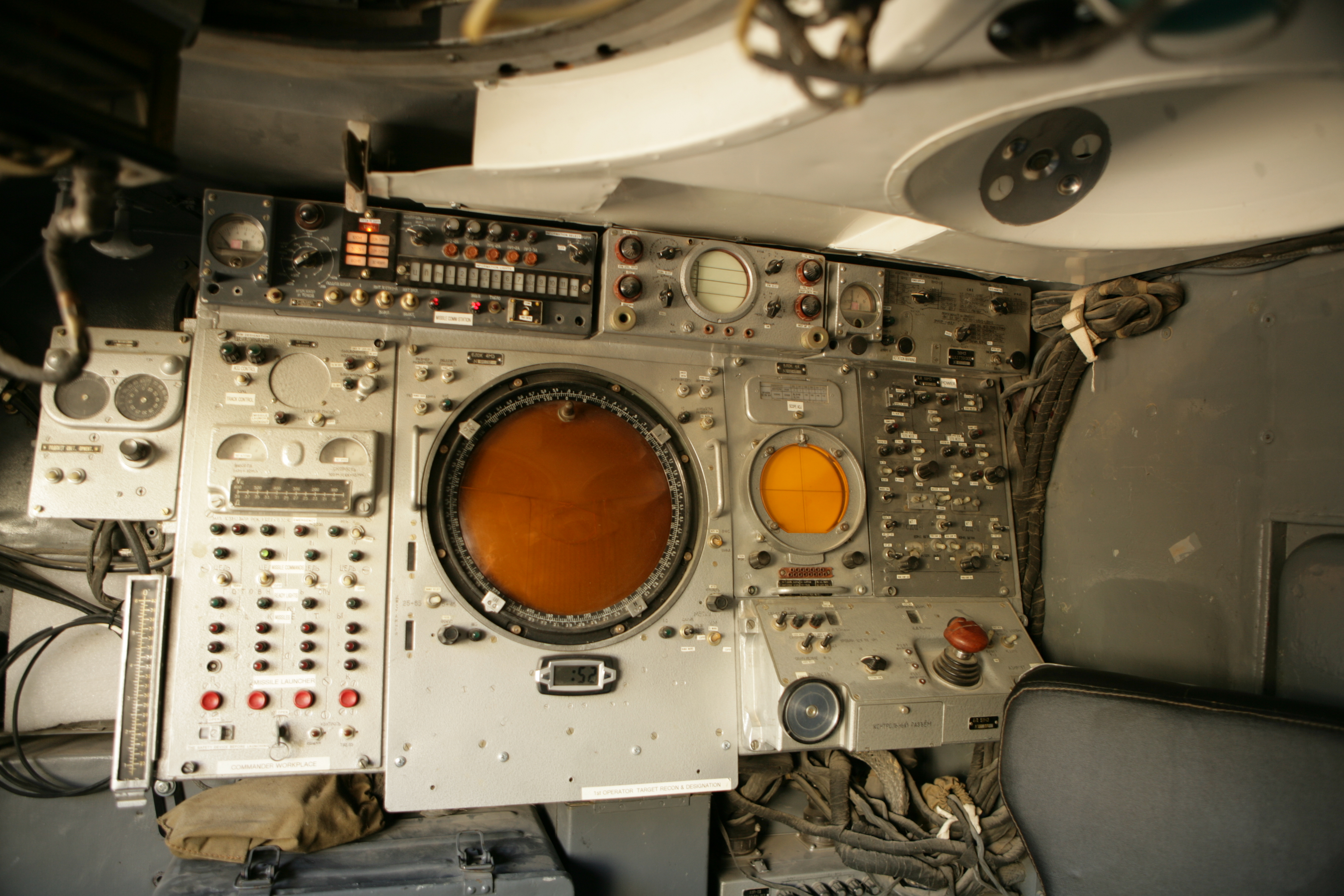
1S91 first/second operator console

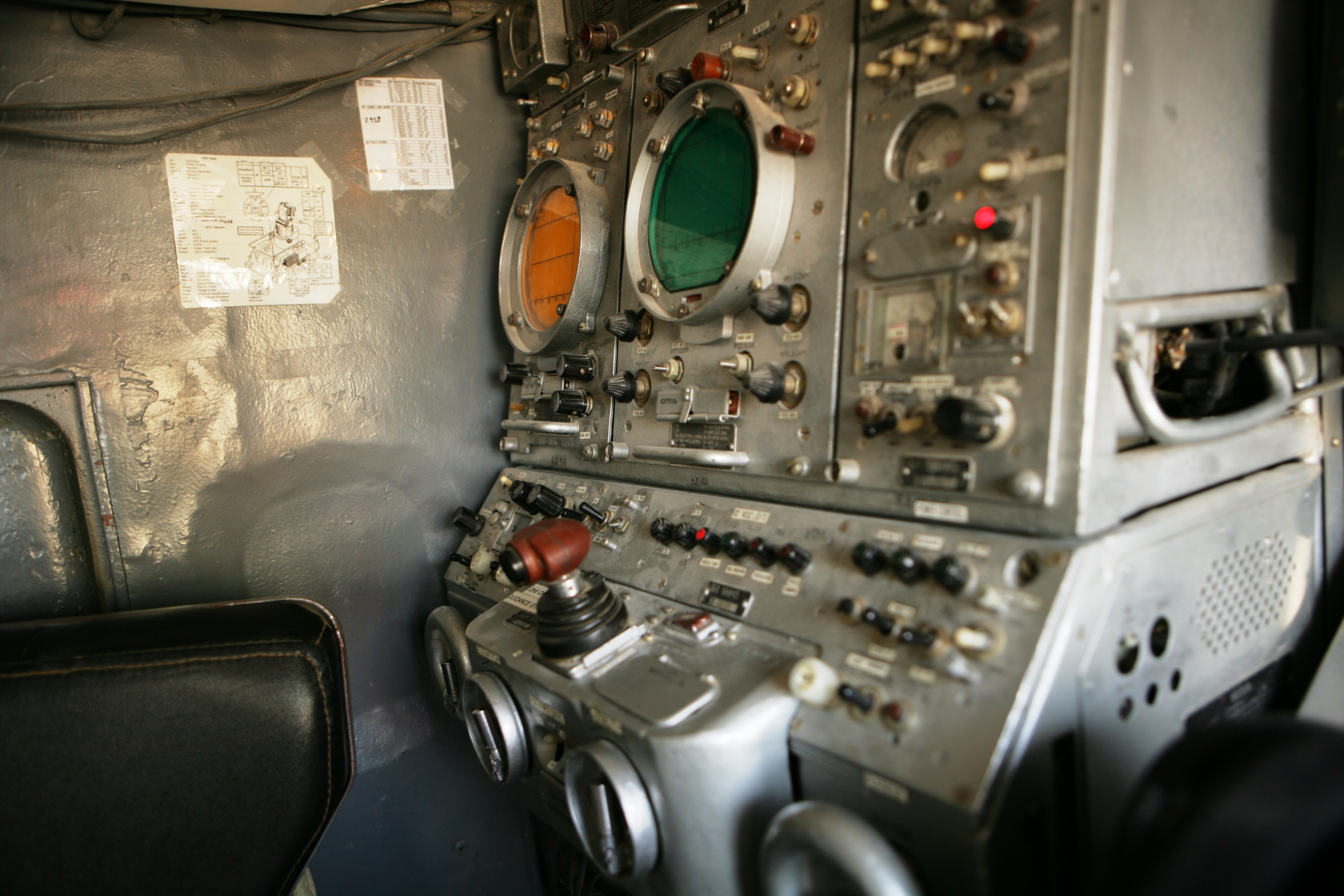
1S91 third operator console

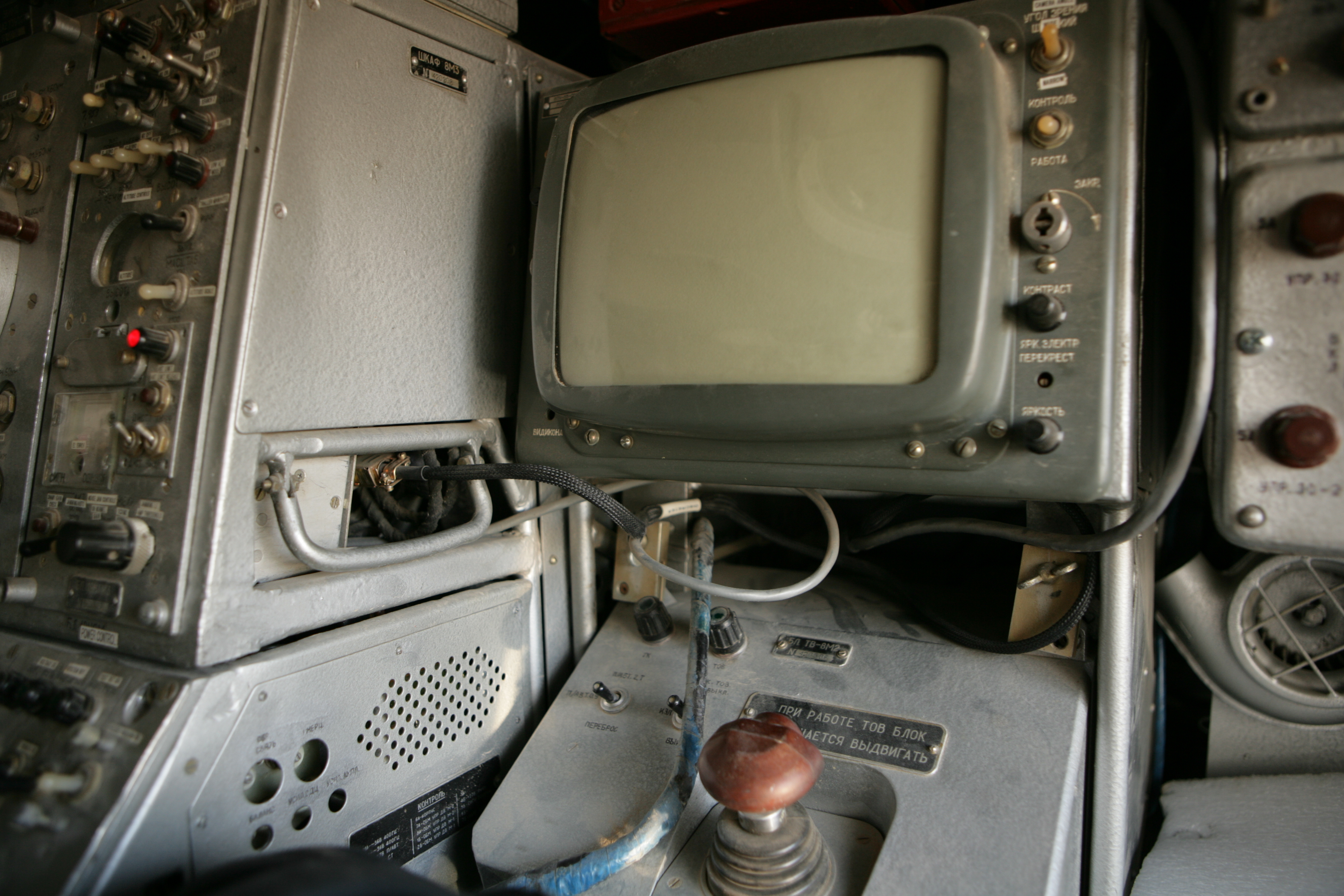
1S91 teleconsole

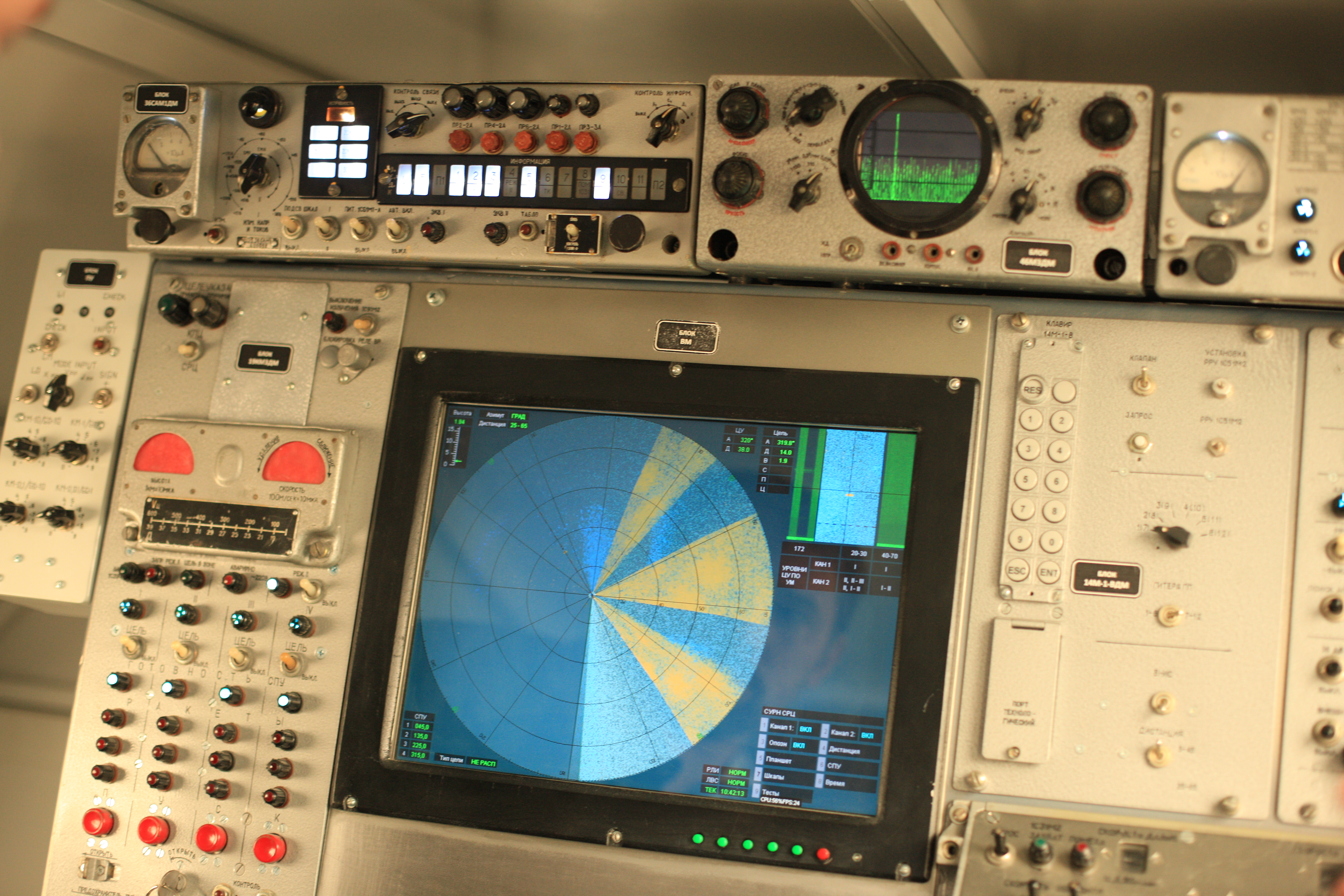
1S91 main operator console (after upgrade)

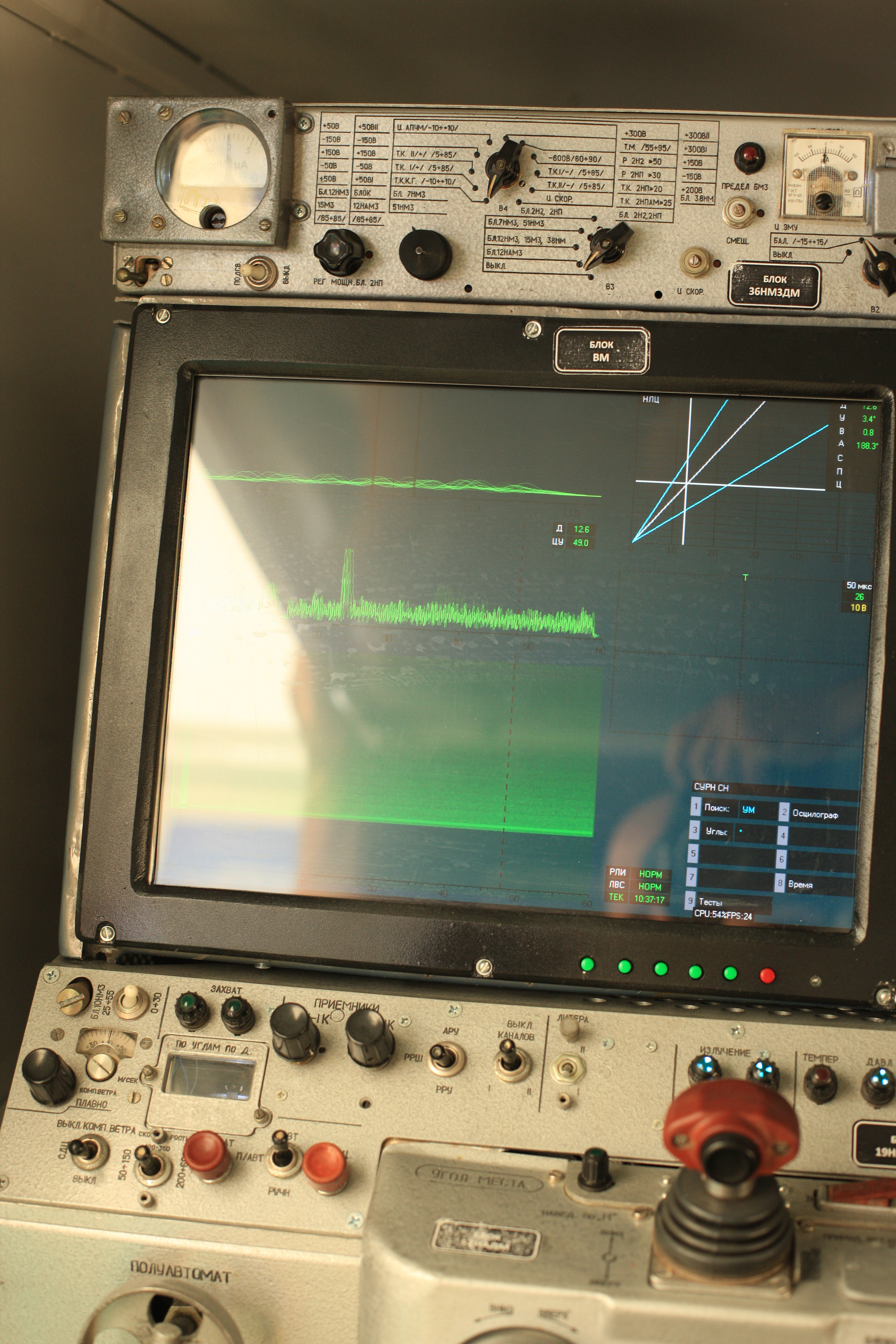
1S91 third operator console (after upgrade)

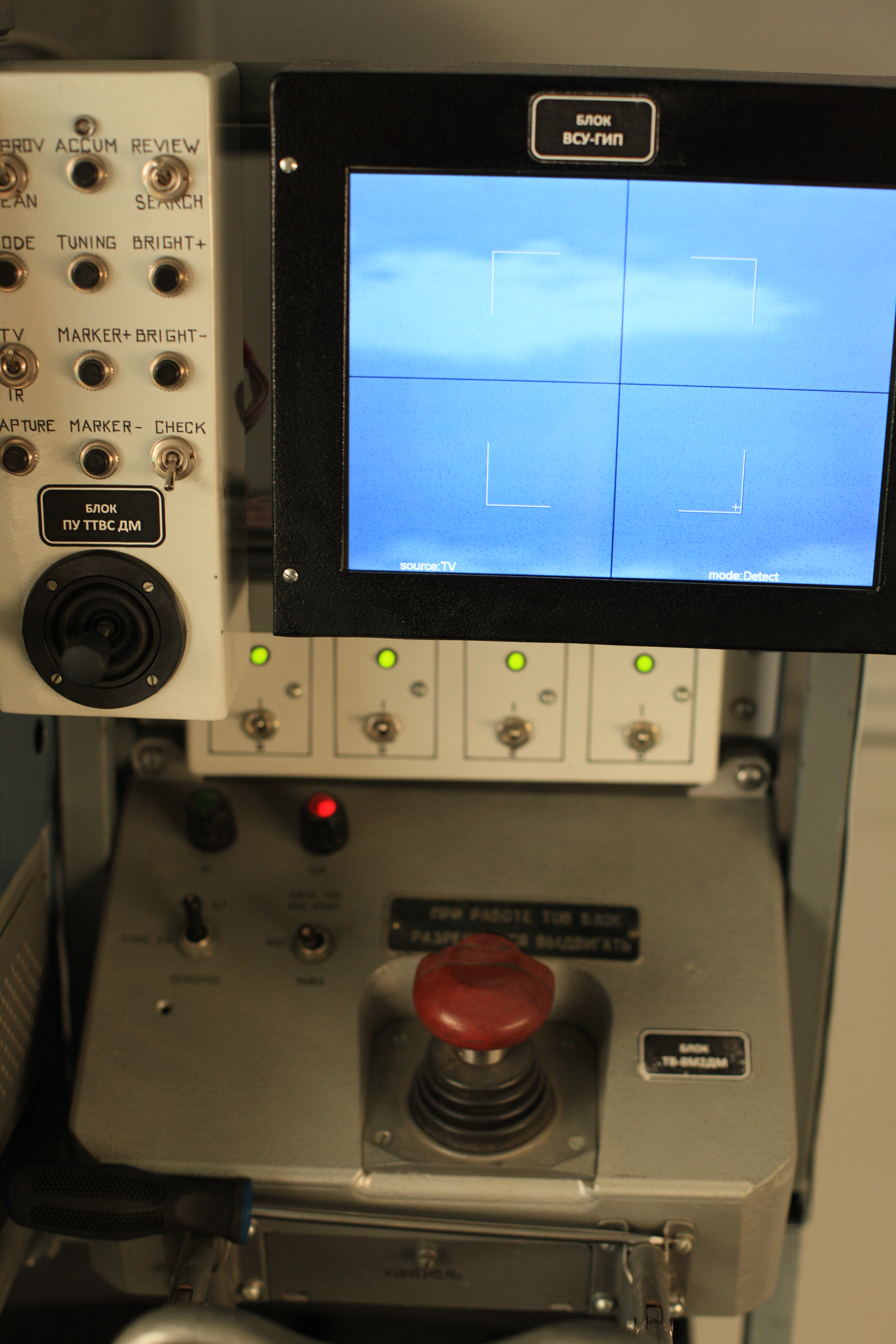
1S91 teleconsole (after upgrade)

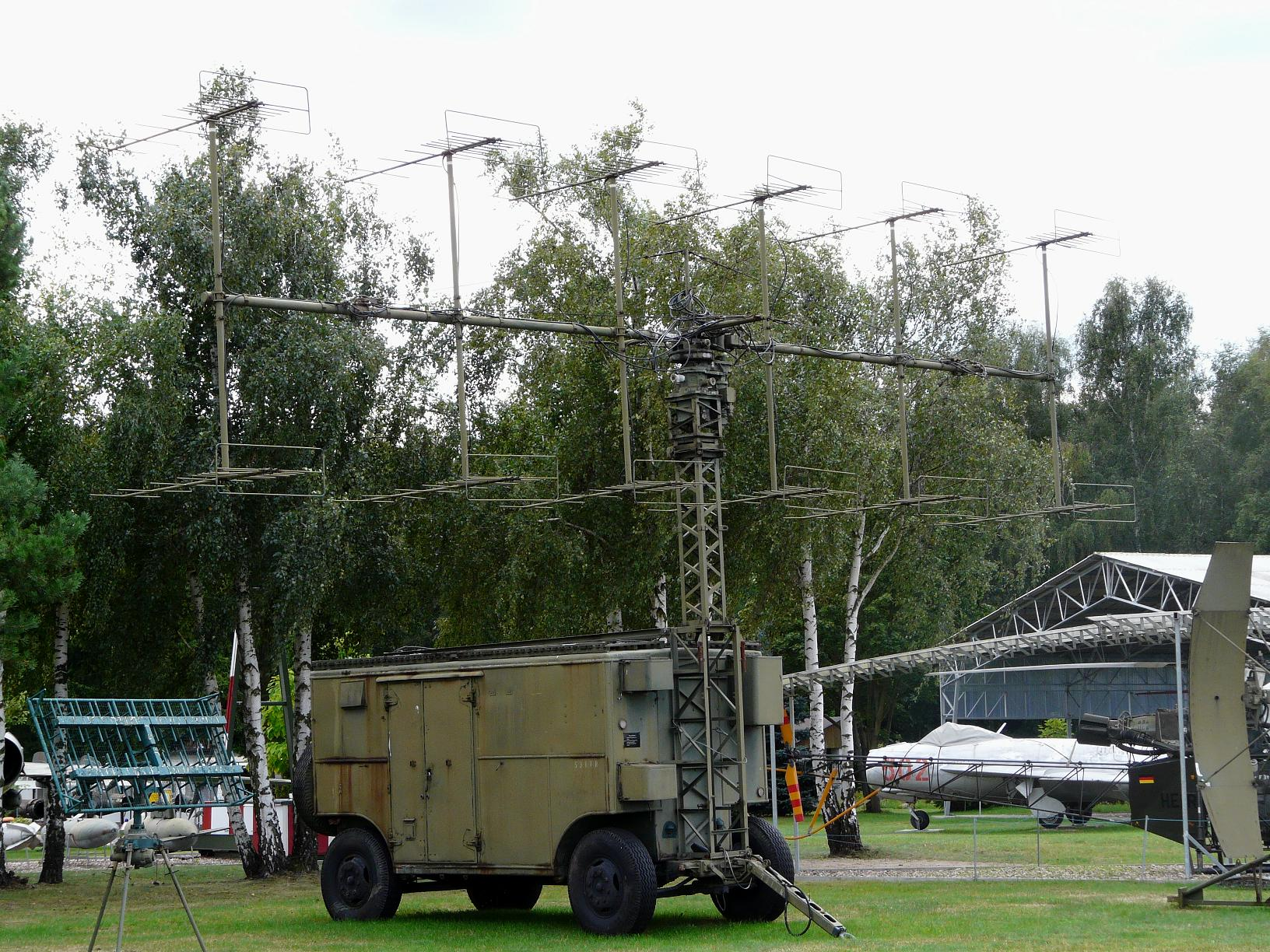
NRS-12 "Score Board" IFF radar (bottom left - mounted on tri-pod) and P-12 "Spoon Rest" (centre - mounted on a towable generator).

== Operational history ==
=== Middle East ===
==== Yom Kippur War ====
In the 1973 Yom Kippur War, the Egyptian and Syrian 2K12s surprised the Israeli military, who were accustomed to having air superiority over the battlefield. The highly mobile 2K12 took a heavy toll on the slower A-4 Skyhawk and even the F-4 Phantom, forming a protective umbrella until they could be removed. The radar warning receivers on the Israeli aircraft did not alert the pilot to the fact that he was being illuminated by the radar. The 2K12 performed well according to a conversation between Israeli General Peled and Henry Kissinger, and caused the most Israeli losses of any Egyptian anti-aircraft missile, followed by the 9K32 Strela-2.

The superior low altitude performance of the weapon, and its new CW semi-active missile seeker resulted in a much higher success rate compared to the earlier S-75 Dvina and S-125 Neva systems. While exact losses are disputed, around 40 aircraft are usually cited as lost to SAMs (the 1st day), and the 2K12 Kub proved the most effective of the three weapons. But in subsequent conflicts, its performance declined as captured examples resulted in effective counter-measures being developed.

==== 1982 Lebanon war ====
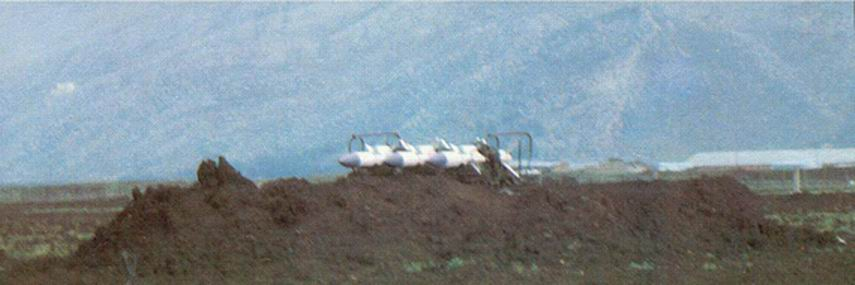
Part of a Syrian 2K12 Kub near the Beirut-Damascus highway, and overlooking the Beqaa Valley, in early 1982.

The Syrians also deployed the 2K12 Kub to Lebanon in 1981 after the Israelis shot down Syrian helicopters near Zahlé. The SAM batteries were placed in the Bekaa Valley near the Beirut-Damascus road. They remained close to the existing Syrian air defense system but could not be fully integrated into it. Early in the 1982 Lebanon war, the Israeli Air Force concentrated on suppressing the SAM threat in the Beqaa Valley, launching Operation Mole Cricket 19. The result was a complete success. Several 2K12 Kub batteries, along with S-75s and S-125 systems, were destroyed in a single day. While Syria's own air defenses remained largely intact, its forces in Lebanon were left exposed to attacks by Israeli strike aircraft for the remainder of the war. It has been reported, however, that at least one Israeli F-4 Phantom fighter-bomber was shot down in the area by a 2K12 Kub on 24 July 1982.

=== South African Border War ===
The People's Armed Forces for the Liberation of Angola (FAPLA) procured a number of 2K12 Kub systems from the Soviet Union in 1981. According to the Central Intelligence Agency, Angola had obtained sixteen TEL launchers for the 2K12 Kub systems, which were deployed in the Moçâmedes District. The South African military noted that the missiles would make it difficult for it to provide air cover for its cross-border operations against guerrillas of the People's Liberation Army of Namibia, which were operating from Angolan sanctuaries. All of Angola's 2K12 Kub launchers were destroyed in a South African preemptive strike as part of Operation Protea.

2K12 Kub missile sites were also operated by Cuban expeditionary forces in Angola during Operation Excite/Hilti. On 26 June 1988, six 3M9M3 missiles launched from a Cuban 2K12 Kub battery were fired at a South African weather balloon being used as a radar decoy over Tchipa. South African observers used the firing data to plot the location of the 2K12 Kub launchers and destroyed them in a concentrated bombardment with G5 howitzers.

=== Western Sahara War ===
Forces of the Polisario Front acquired two full batteries of 2K12 Kub missiles from Algeria during the Western Sahara War, which they used effectively against the fighters of the Royal Moroccan Air Force, including shooting down two Mirage F1 fighters in 1981 during a major battle in Guelta Zemmur.

=== Poland ===
On 19 August 2003, a Polish Air Force Su-22M4K was accidentally shot down by friendly fire during an exercise by a Polish 2K12 Kub battery. The aircraft was flying 21 km (13 mi) from the coast over the Baltic Sea near Ustka. The pilot, General Andrzej Andrzejewski, ejected and was rescued after two hours in the water.

=== Libya ===
The system was deployed by Libya during the border dispute with Chad and proved a threat for French aircraft. On 16 February 1986, the system failed in detecting low flying French jets which were attacking the Ouadi Doum airbase. On 7 January 1987, the French Air Force were successful in destroying a 2K12 Kub radar site in the Faya Largeau area with SEPECAT Jaguars armed with Martel anti-radiation missiles.

In March, the Chadian rebels captured Ouadi Doum air base, seizing virtually all heavy equipment used for the defense of this airfield, intact. Most of this equipment was transported to France and the United States in the following days, but some 2K12 Kub systems remained in Chad.

With this catastrophe, the Libyan occupation of northern Chad – and the annexation of the Aouzou Strip – was over: by 30 March, the bases at Faya Largeau and Aouzou had to be abandoned. The LARAF now had a completely different task: its Tu-22Bs were to attack the abandoned bases and destroy as much equipment left there as possible. The first strikes were flown in April, and they continued until 8 August 1987, when two Tu-22Bs tasked to strike Aouzou were ambushed by a captured 2K12 Kub battery used by the Chadian Army. One of the bombers was shot down.

Libyan air defense, including 2K12 Kub batteries, was active during the 2011 military intervention in Libya.

=== Iraq ===
Several 2K12 Kub batteries, along with other SAM systems and military equipment, were supplied to Iraq before and during the Iran–Iraq War as part of large military packages from the Soviet Union. The batteries were active since the start of the war in September 1980, scoring kills against U.S-supplied Iranian F-4 Phantoms and Northrop F-5s.

The SA-6/Kub was also used during the 1991 Gulf War. The threat posed by these SAMs led to the US Navy outfitting the ALQ-167 Bullwinkle Jamming pod on their F-14A/A+ Tomcats and A-6E TRAM/SWIP Intruder aircraft. On the opening night of Desert Storm, on 17 January 1991, a B-52G was damaged by a missile. Different versions of this engagement are told. It could have been an S-125 or a 2K12 Kub while other versions report a MiG-29 hit the bomber with a R-27R missile. However, the U.S. Air Force disputes these claims, stating the bomber was actually hit by friendly fire, an AGM-88 High-speed, Anti-Radiation Missile (HARM) that homed on the fire-control radar of the B-52's tail gun; the jet was subsequently renamed In HARM's Way. Shortly following this incident, General George Lee Butler announced that the gunner position on B-52 crews would be eliminated, and the gun turrets permanently deactivated, commencing on 1 October 1991.

On 19 January 1991, a USAF F-16 (serial 87-228) was shot down by a 2K12 Kub during the massive (though ill-fated) Package Q Strike against a heavily defended Baghdad. It was the tenth coalition aircraft lost in combat in Operation Desert Storm. The pilot, Captain Harry 'Mike' Roberts, ejected safely but was taken prisoner and freed in March 1991. The aircraft was on a mission to attack the Air Defense Headquarters Building. It had flown 4 combat missions before being lost.

The 2K12 Kub threat was largely controlled by Allied EW assets together with the older S-75s and S-125 missile systems. Most of the losses were due to IR guided SAMs.

Kubs continued to be used by the Iraqi military, along with other SAM systems, to challenge the Western imposed no-fly zones during the 1990s and early 2000s. They were not able to shoot down any Coalition aircraft though several sites were destroyed as retaliation. In one incident, on 11 September 1996, during Operation Provide Comfort II, one missile was fired against two USAF F-16 in northern Iraq but missed. On 30 December 1998, a 2K12 Kub site near Talil fired 6-8 missiles at aircraft enforcing the Southern Watch component of the NFZ. American F-16s responded by dropping six GBU-12 laser-guided bombs on the site and also launching two HARMs "as a preemptive measure" to warn Iraqi radar operators against carrying out more firings.

=== Former Yugoslavia ===
A Bosnian Mi-17 was shot down by an Army of Republika Srpska 2K12 Kub on 28 May 1995, killing Bosnian Foreign Minister Irfan Ljubijankić, as well as six other passengers and crew. On 2 June 1995, Bosnian Serb forces managed to shoot down an American F-16C piloted by Scott O'Grady using a modified 2K12 Kub.

On the first night of the Kosovo War (24/25 March 1999), a Yugoslav Air Force Mikoyan MiG-29 flown by Major Predrag Milutinović was downed by a Kub battery in a friendly fire incident while approaching Niš Airport after an unsuccessful engagement with NATO aircraft.

At the time, the Yugoslav Air Force and Air Defence had 22 2K12 Kub batteries. Using shoot and scoot tactics, the self-propelled air defence system demonstrated a good level of survivability with only three radars lost in the face of nearly four-hundred AGM-88 HARM anti-radiation missiles fired. In comparison, the fixed S-75 and S-125 sites suffered losses as high as 66 to 80 percent. According to General Spasoje Smiljanić, 70 2K12 Kub missiles were fired in 46 separate engagements over the course of 78 days.

=== Syrian Civil War ===
On 14 April 2018, American, British, and French forces launched 103 air-to-surface and cruise missiles targeting sites in Syria. According to the Russian military, twenty-one Kub missiles launched in response allegedly destroyed eleven incoming missiles, However, the American Department of Defense claimed no Allied missiles were shot down.

=== Yemen Civil War ===
South Yemen formerly operated these systems in the South Yemeni air defense forces. Later, United Yemen purchased a large number of these systems in the 1990s and they entered service with the Yemeni air defense forces in 1999. On 6 June 2019, Houthi forces successfully shot down a USAF MQ-9. CENTCOM officials blamed the shoot down on a Houthi-operated and domestically made Fater-1 missile – a SAM system upgraded from a Soviet 2K12 Kub air defence system.

=== War in Ukraine ===
Ukraine retired its Kub batteries in the early 2000s to focus on the more modern Buk systems, but with the outbreak of the Russo-Ukrainian war in 2014, Ukraine's Aerotekhnika company begun repairing some of the 89 Kub units in storage and modernize them to the Kub M3/2D standard. According to Ukrainian media, two units were operational in 2021, while the Pentagon estimated that only one was operational prior to the Russian invasion in 2022.

On 17 March 2023, the Slovak government approved the transfer of two Kub missile launchers, one Kub radar, spare parts, 52 pieces of 3M9ME missiles and 148 pieces of 3M9M3E missiles to Ukraine.

On 10 May 2023, the President of Czech Republic, Petr Pavel, has announced that his country will send two "2K12 Kub" missile systems to Ukraine with a "relatively large number" of missiles. On late August 2023, photos of Czech 2K12M2 Kub-M2 systems in Ukrainian service appeared on social media.

By March 2026, according to Ukrainian Unmanned Systems Forces (Ukraine), the destruction of Buk missile launchers, by Ukrainian drones strikes, mean that Kub missile launchers are being deployed by Russia to cover the losses of Buk launchers in "some areas".

== Operators ==
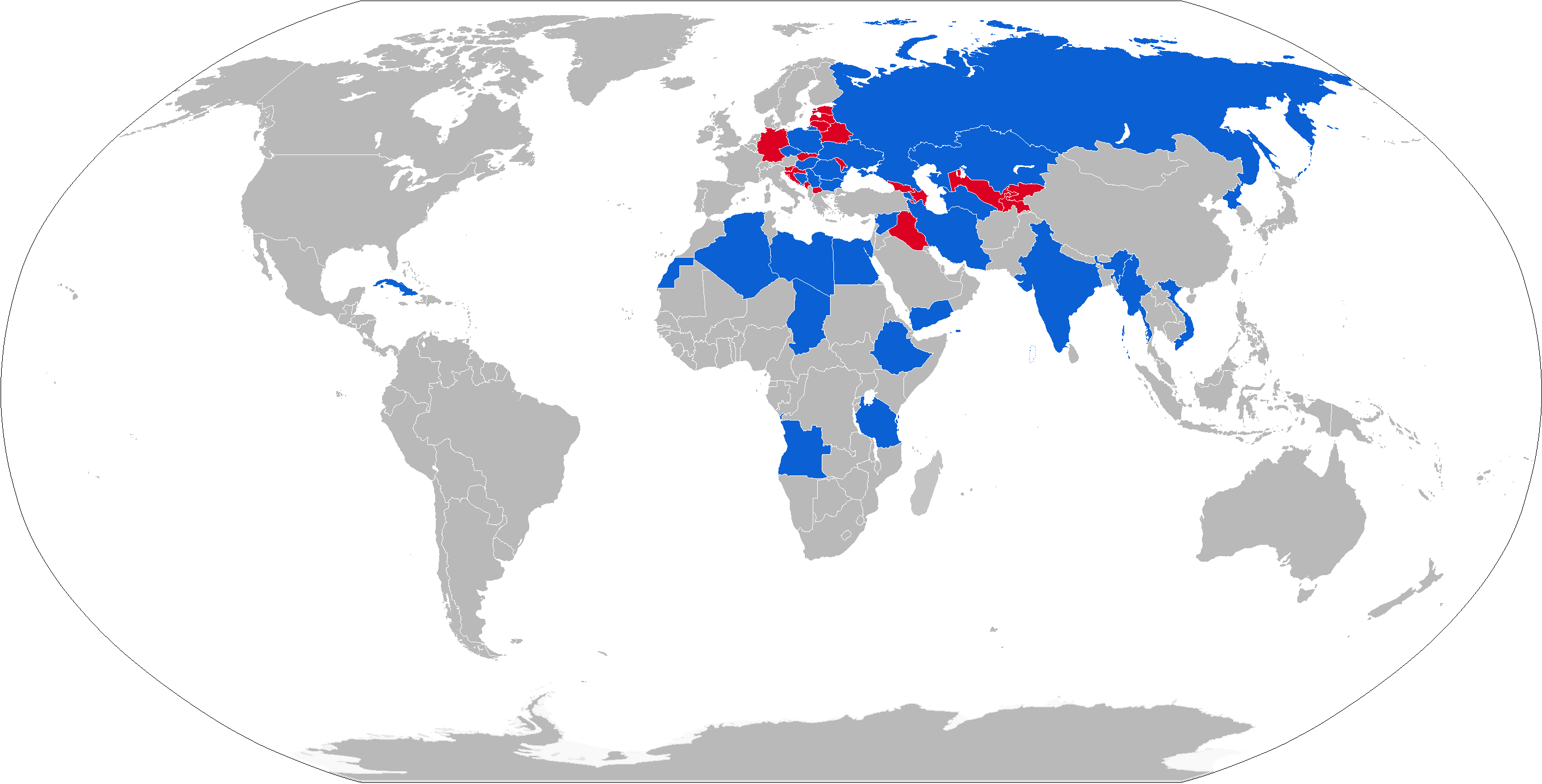
Operators Current Former.

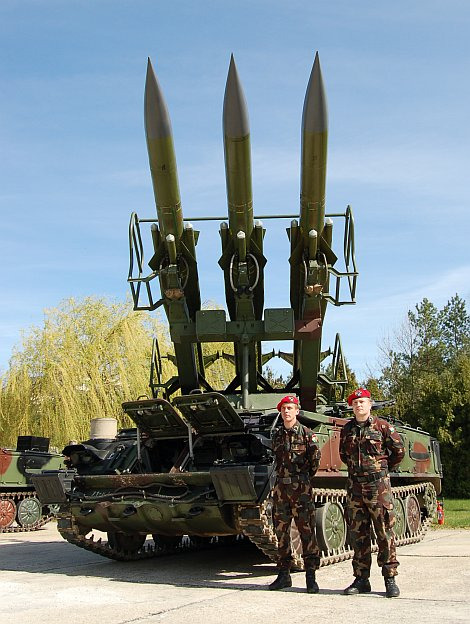
Hungarian modernized 2K12 Kub launcher.

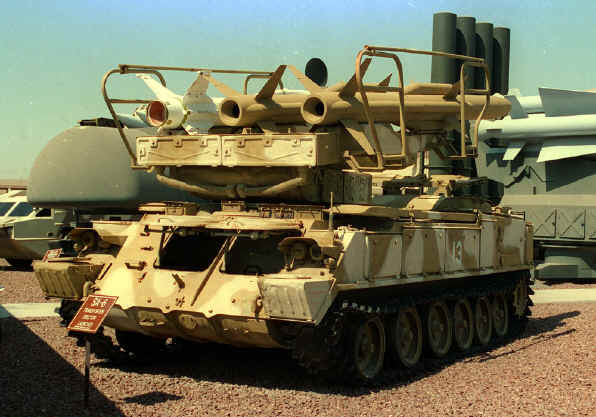
3M9 TEL in desert camouflage. Photo by Nellis AFB.

=== Current ===
- Algeria − Unknown number of 2K12 Kvadrat in service as of 2024.
- Angola − 16 2K12-ML Kvadrat-ML in service as of 2024.
- Armenia − Unknown number in service as of 2024.
- Bosnia and Herzegovina − 20 as of 2024.
- Bulgaria − Unknown number in service as of 2024.
- Chad − 4 as of 2024.
- Cuba − Unknown number in service as of 2024.
- Czech Republic − 8 2K12M2 Kub-M2 as of 2024.
- Egypt − 56+ as of 2024.
- Germany - At least 1 operational system retained from East German stocks for threat simulation.
- Hungary − 16 as of 2024.
- India − 180 as of 2024.
- Kazakhstan − Unknown number in service as of 2024.
- Myanmar − Unknown number of 2K12 Kvadrat-M in service as of 2024.
- Poland − 20 as of 2024.
- Romania − 32 as of 2024.
- Serbia − 12 batteries in service with the Serbian Air Force and Air Defence as of 2024.
- Slovakia − Unknown number in service as of 2024.
- Syria − Unknown number in service prior to the fall of the Assad regime.
- Tanzania − Unknown number in service as of 2024. Serviceability doubtful
- Turkmenistan − Unknown number in service as of 2024.
- Ukraine − Two batteries donated by the Czech Republic and two launchers donated by Slovakia in 2023.
- Vietnam − Unknown number in service as of 2024.

=== Non-state ===
- (Libya) Libyan National Army − Unknown number of 2K12 Kvadrat in service as of 2024.
- (Sahrawi Arab Democratic Republic) Polisario Front − At least 4.

=== Former ===
- Artsakh − Operated an unknown number in 2016.
- Czechoslovakia − Passed on to successor states.
- East Germany − Passed on to the unified German state.
- Iraq
- North Korea
- Libya
- Russia − 400 in 2002
- Soviet Union − 800 in 1989. Passed on to successor states.
- North Yemen − Passed on to the unified Yemeni state.
- South Yemen − Passed on to the unified Yemeni state.
- Yemen
- Yugoslavia − Passed on to successor states.
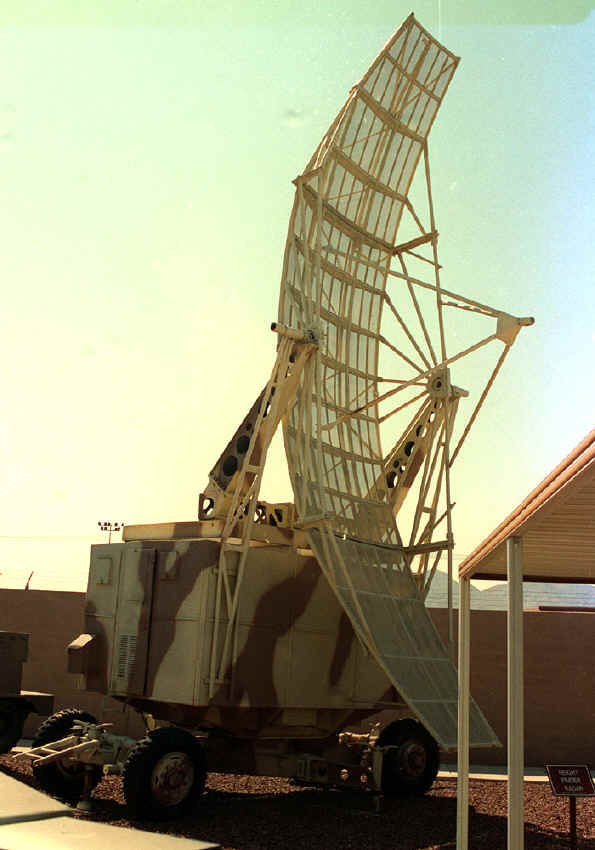
"Side Net" height finding radar. Photo by Nellis AFB.

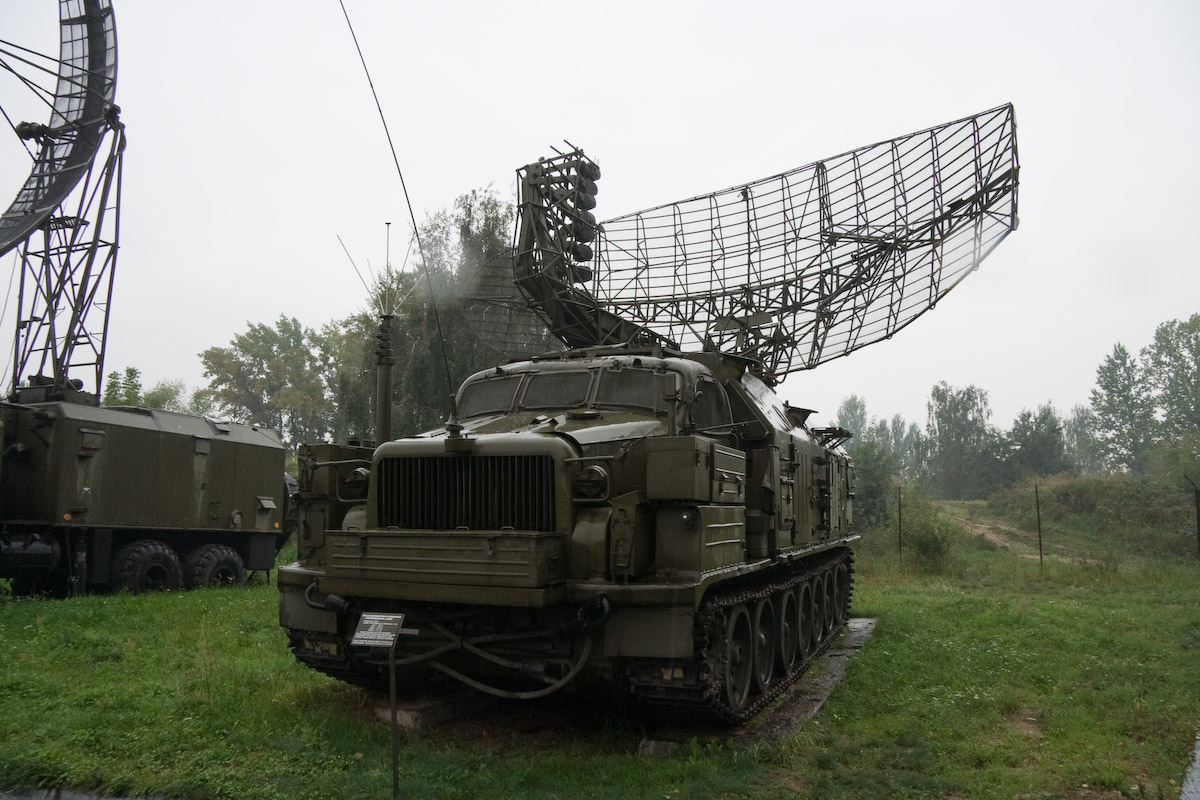
P-40 "Long Track" early warning radar. Photo by Nellis AFB.

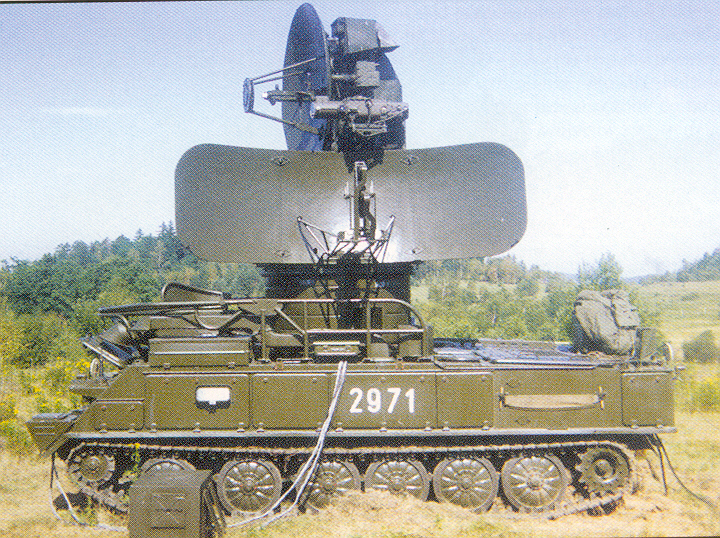
An 1S91 (Straight Flush) radar of the Hungarian Army's 2K12 Kub missile system

== Sources ==
- Cooper, Tom (2017). Hot Skies Over Yemen, Volume 1: Aerial Warfare Over the South Arabian Peninsula, 1962-1994. Solihull, UK: Helion & Company Publishing. ISBN 978-1-912174-23-2.
- International Institute for Strategic Studies (1989). The military balance, 1989-1990. London: Brassey's. ISBN 978-0080375694.
- International Institute for Strategic Studies (2016). The Military Balance 2016. Vol. 116. Routledge. ISBN 9781857438352.
- International Institute for Strategic Studies (2024). The Military Balance 2024. Taylor & Francis. ISBN 978-1-040-05115-3.
- O'Halloran, James C.; Foss, Christopher F., eds. (2002). Jane's Land-Based Air Defense 2002-2003 (15th ed.). Janes Information Group. ISBN 978-0-7106-2437-6.
