= GM chassis =

Russian tracked vehicle chassis

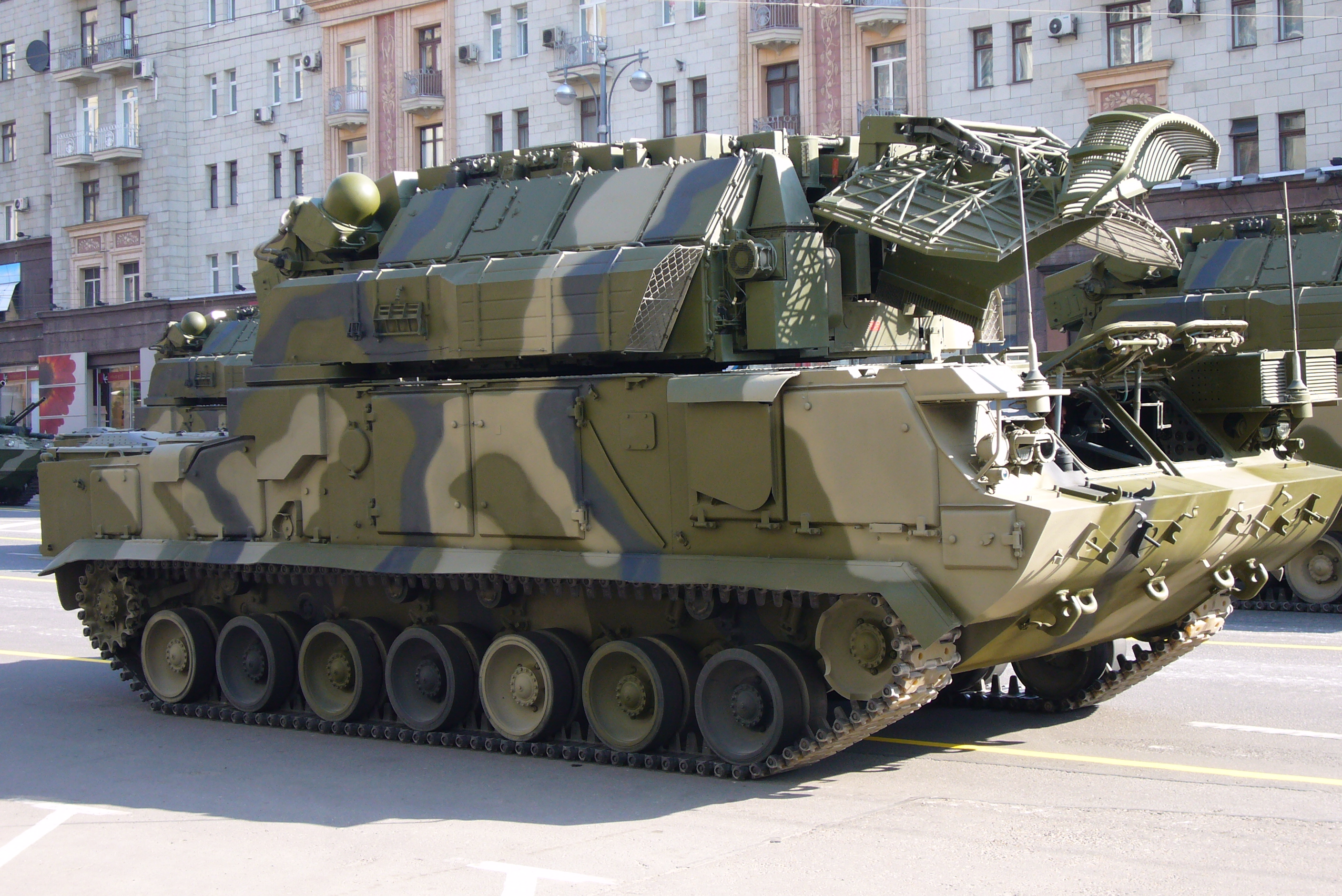
Tor missile system on a GM-5955 chassis.

GM (Russian: Gusenichnaya Mashina, Гусеничная машина, lit. tracked machine) is a series of tracked vehicle chassis. Generally, the series is produced by Russia's Mytishchi Machine-Building Plant. Some older series were developed and produced by Belarusian agriculture machinery manufacturer Minsk Tractor Works (MTZ).

== GM-569 ==
GM-569 is used for the TELAR 9A38, part of the Buk-M1-2 SAM system.

=== Specifications ===
- Chassis weight: 24,000 kg
- Max load: 11,500 kg
- Wheelbase: 4,605 mm
- Ground clearance: 450 mm
- Fuel distance: 500 km
- Working environment
  - outside temperature: −50°C — +50°C
  - relative air humidity: 98% (t = +35 °C)
  - overall dust level while driving < 2,5 g/m^{3}
- Max velocity: 65 km/h
- Average ground unit pressure < 0,8 kg/cm^{2}
- Engine type: Multifuel liquid-cooled diesel
- On-board powerplant: 522 kW (710 h.p.) — 618 kW (840 h.p.)

== Other types of chassis ==
Designed and developed at Metrovagonmash (previously MMZ and OKB-40):

GM-577 chassis (without a special purpose superstructure)

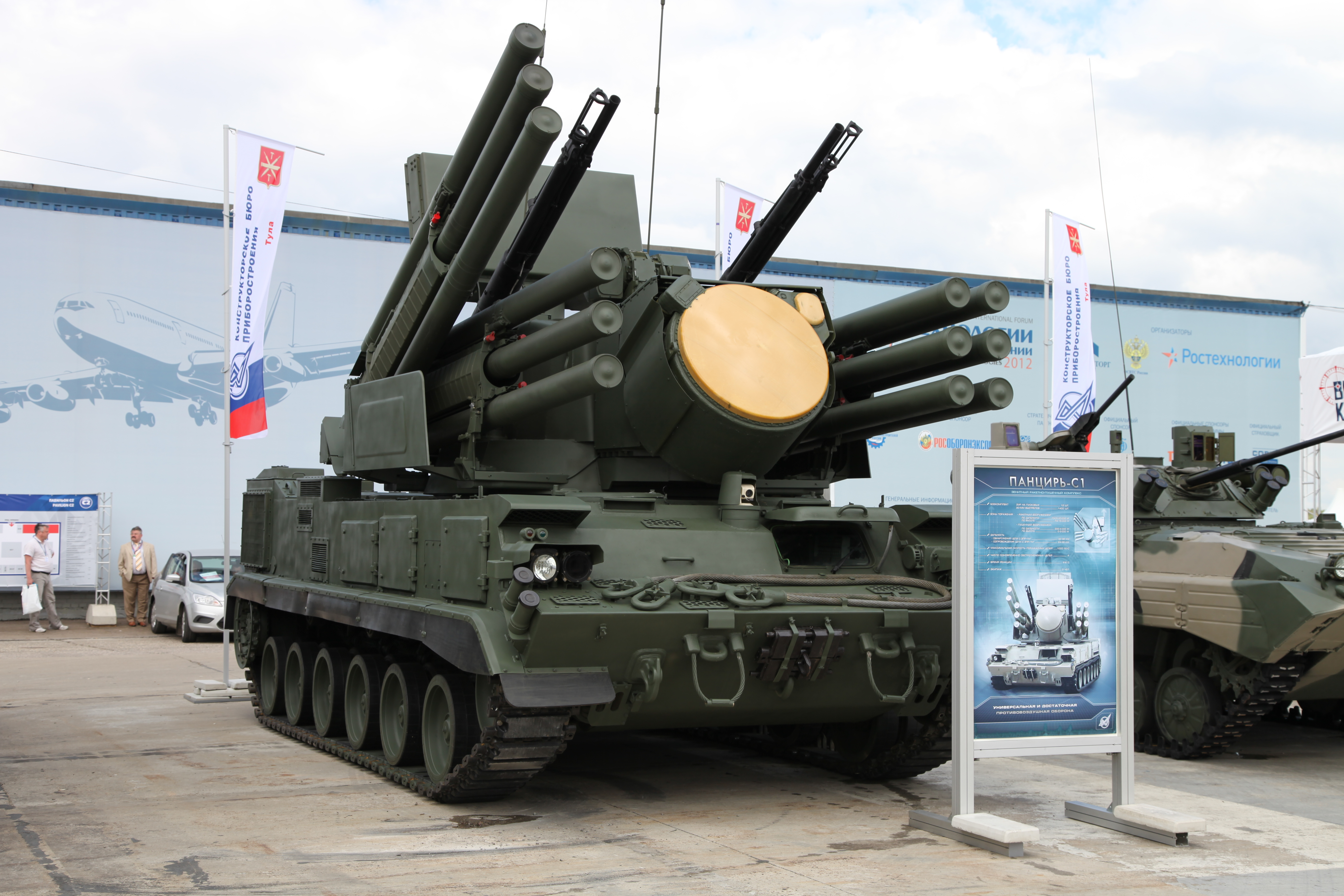
Pantsir-S1 on a GM-352 chassis

- GM-5975 is used for 2K22 Tunguska
- GM-5965 is used for Ranzhir-M
- GM-5955 is used for Tor-M1 (SA-15). The export version Tor-M2E (9A331MK) was designed on a different MZKT-6922 wheeled chassis designed by MZKT.
- GM-579 is used for the SAM command post vehicle 9C470
- GM-577 is used for transporter erector launcher (TEL) with loading capability 9A39 (SA-11/17))
- GM-577 is also used for TELAR 9A310
- GM-578 was used for the TEL 2P25 of the 2K12 Kub Missile System
- GM-568 was used for Self-propelled Reconnaissance and Homing Vehicle (SURN) 1S91 of the 2K12 Kub Missile System (SA-6).
- GM-539 was used in SA-6B
- GM-575 chassis was used for ZSU-23-4 Shilka.

Also MMZ produced GM-569, GM-567A, GM-562, GM-5959, GM-5951, GM-5952.

Designed and developed at Minsk Tractor Works (MTZ):

- GM-369 tracked chassis
- GM-355 was used for BM (translit. Battle Machines) series 9A330, including Target Detection Station (SOTS), Homing Station (SN), and the TEL of 9K330 Tor Missile System
- GM-352 was used for the BM 2C6 (2K22 Tunguska)
- GM-352M chassis was used for 2T Stalker IFV.

By others:

- GM-123 and GM-124 were used for the 2S3 Akatsiya self-propelled gun based on 152mm D-20 gun as well as for 2K11 Krug SAM system, but also for 2S4 Tyulpan self-propelled mortar, 2S5 Giatsint-S self-propelled howitzer.
- GM-426 tracked chassis
- GM-830 and GM-835 were used for the S-300V SAM system, those chassis were developed by KB-3 of Leningrad Kirov Plant (currently, PO Spetsmash)
