= Kalinin Machine-Building Plant =

Russian artillery and vehicle manufacturer

- Type: Public Joint Stock Company
- Industry: Defense
- Founded: 1866
- Headquarters: Yekaterinburg, Russia
- Products: Anti-aircraft missile systems, missiles, forklifts, trucks, cars
- Revenue: $611 million (2017)
- Number of employees: 6,344 (2020)
- Parent: Almaz-Antey
- Website: www.zik.ru

JSC Kalinin Machine-Building Plant, ZiK or MZiK for short (Russian: Машиностроительный завод имени М.И.Калинина, ЗиК, МЗиК) is a Russian industrial company known for producing artillery and vehicles. It is now part of the Almaz-Antey holding company.

== History ==
Founded in 1866 in St. Petersburg by a decree of Russian emperor Alexander II as an artillery workshop, it was later enlarged into a state factory of field and later on anti-aircraft artillery.

In 1918 the factory was moved into Moscow Region, in 1941 to Yekaterinburg (former Sverdlovsk), where it's located up to now.

During World War II, the factory produced 20,000 anti-aircraft guns, last channel artillery unit under mass production was the 152mm KM-52.

Since the end of the 1950s, the factory is specializing on the mass production anti-aircraft rocket systems (SAM defence).

Civil products include diesel and electrical forklift trucks, public service trucks, electrocars, etc.

In 2014, Malik Gaisin was appointed the director of the plant.

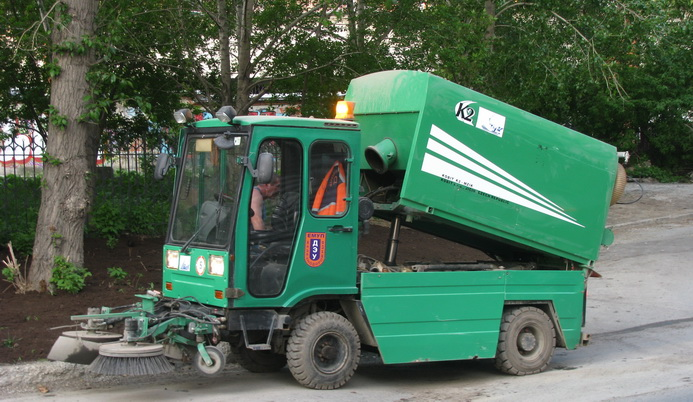
Public service truck

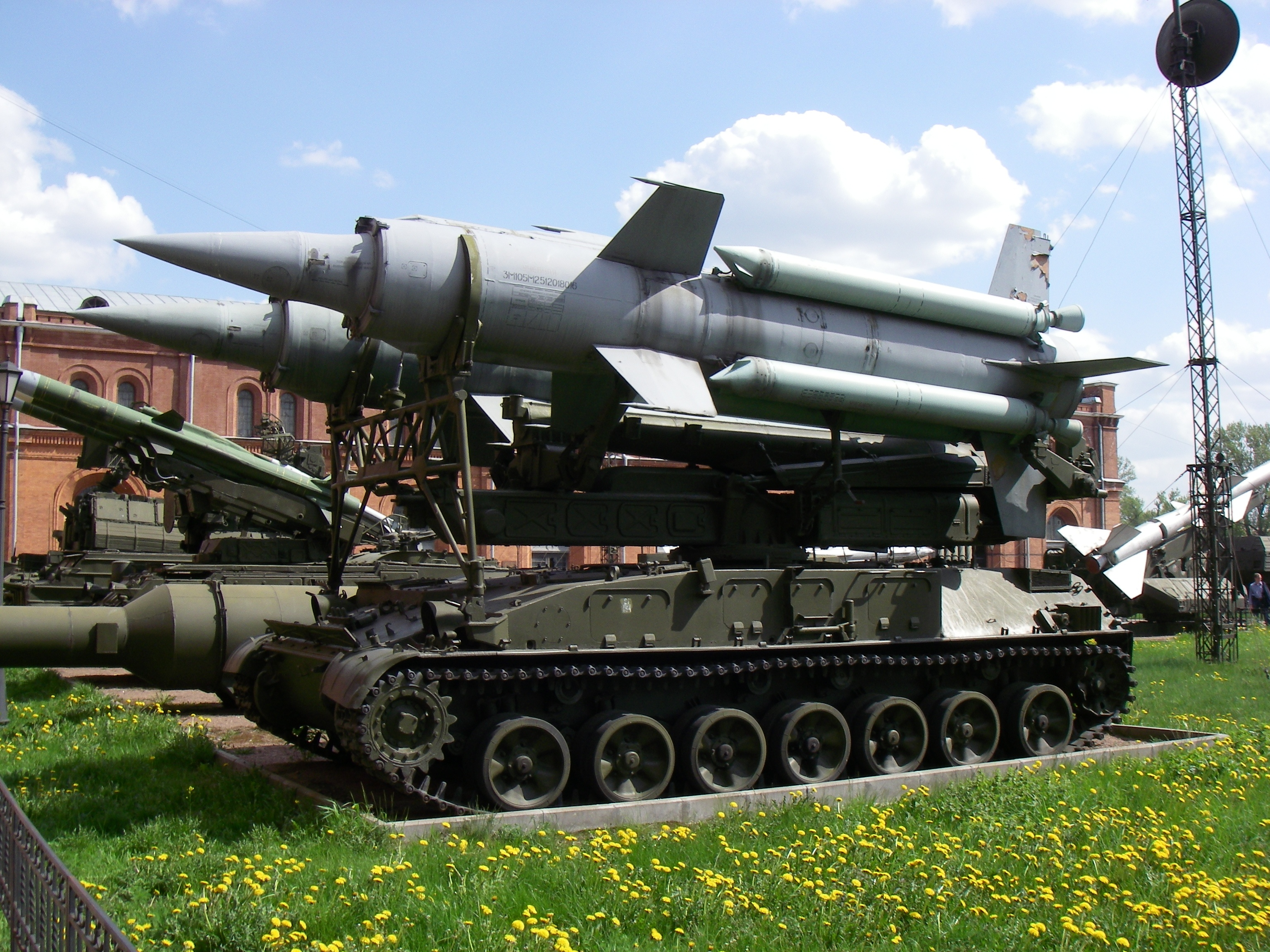

== Products ==
=== Civil ===
Municipal vacuum paving machine MK-1500M2 (discontinued)

Municipal vacuum paving machine MK2000

MR-20 series electric loaders

Electric loaders EP-103KAS (discontinued)

ET-2054 platform electric trolleys

Appliances (In 1990-1991 the plant produced an electric slow cooker "Paryonka")

=== Military ===
- Combat assets of the S-300 V anti-aircraft missile system;
- Combat means of the BUK-M1 anti-aircraft missile system;
- Combat weapons of the Krug air defense system (produced in the 60s-70s);
- Combat weapons of the Kub air defense system (produced in the 60s-70s).

== Awards ==
- Order of Lenin (16.01.1939) — for exceptional services to the country in arming the Red Army, creating and mastering new types of weapons
- Order of the Red Banner of Labour (12.05.1941)
- Order of the Patriotic War I degree (09.07.1945)
- Order of the October Revolution (24.02.1976)
