= 2K11 Krug =

2K11 Krug NATO reporting name: SA-4 "Ganef"
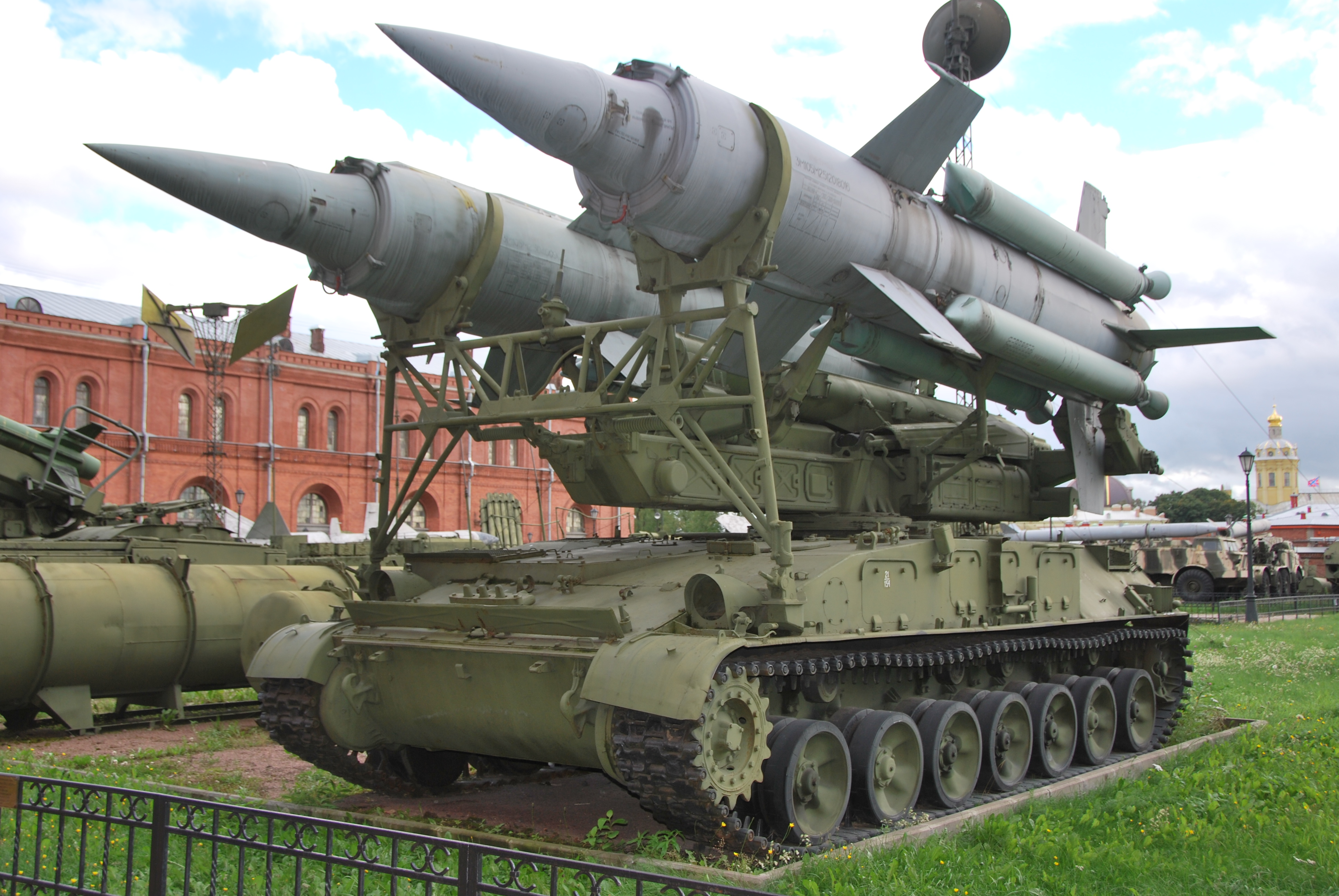
- 2P24 TEL from the system 2K11 carrying two 3M8 missiles at Saint-Petersburg Artillery museum
- Type: Transportable SAM system
- Place of origin: Soviet Union

Service history
- In service: 1965–present 1965–1990s (USSR)
- Used by: See list of operators

Production history
- Designer: Lyulev Novator
- Designed: 1957
- Manufacturer: MZiK
- Variants: Krug, Krug-A, Krug-M, Krug-M1, Krug-M2, Krug-M3

Specifications (2K11 Krug)
- Mass: 28,200 kg (62,200 lb)
- Length: 7.5 m (25 ft) (9.46 m (31 ft) with missiles)
- Width: 3.2 m (10 ft)
- Height: 4.472 m (14 ft 8 in) (with missiles)
- Crew: 3 to 5
- Armour: 15 mm (0.59 in)
- Engine: V59 V-12 water-cooled diesel 520 hp
- Power/weight: 17.33 hp/t
- Ground clearance: 0.44 m (1 ft 5 in)
- Fuel capacity: 850 L (190 imp gal; 220 US gal)
- Operational range: 780 km (480 mi)
- Maximum speed: 35 km/h (22 mph)

The 2K11 Krug (Russian: Круг, lit. 'circle') is a Soviet and now Russian medium-range, medium-to-high altitude surface-to-air missile (SAM) system. The system was designed by NPO Novator and produced by Kalinin Machine Building Plant. Its GRAU designation is "2K11." Its NATO reporting name is SA-4 Ganef, after the Yiddish (originally Hebrew) word גנבֿ meaning 'thief'; the name was used because the system resembled the Bristol Bloodhound.

== Development and service ==
Development of the Krug ZRK-SD (2K11) air defense system started in 1957 by the Lyulev OKB design bureau. It was first displayed during a parade in Moscow in May 1965. The system started to be fielded in 1967 and became fully operational in 1969. It was used by the Soviet Army as a long-range SAM.

The early version of the Krug entered service in 1965. The first operational deployment version, the Krug-A, entered service in 1967, with extensively modified versions, the Krug-M in 1971 and the Krug-M1 in 1974, which were developed to rectify problems discovered during army service. A target drone called 9M316M Virazh, developed from obsolete Krug missiles, was proposed for export in 1994.

The 2K11 was briefly operated by the Soviet army during the war in Afghanistan in 1979 and 1980, but was withdrawn several months after the initial invasion. In 1997, it was reported that, between 1993 and 1996, some 27 fire units of Krug and 349 missiles had been sold to Armenia. Poland flight tested four missiles in September 2006 against P-15 Termit (SS-N-2 'Styx') targets.

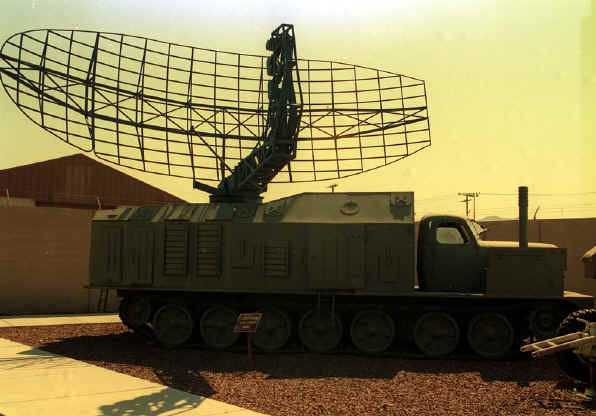
The P-40 "Long Track" radar set.

== Description ==
=== Vehicles ===
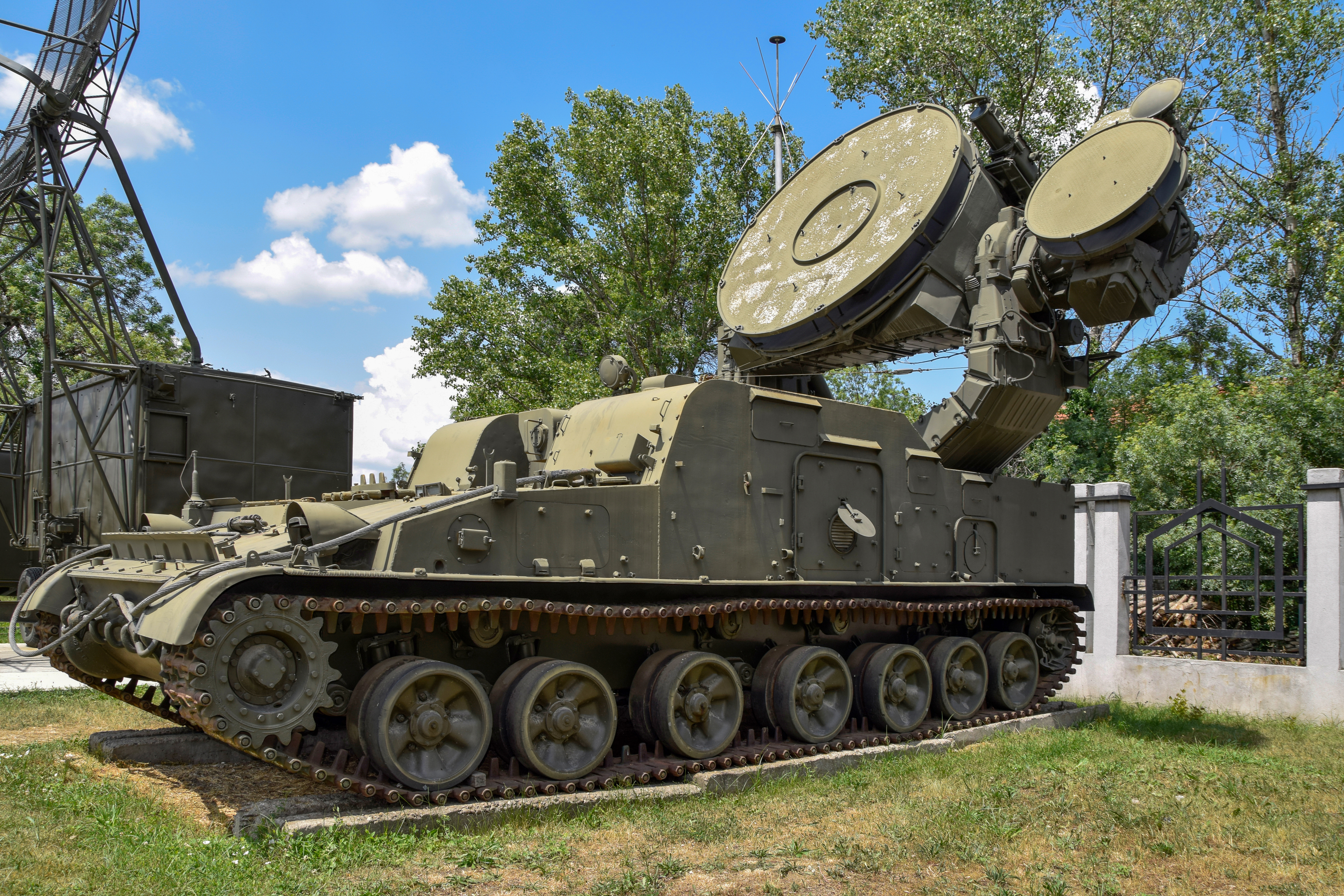
The 1S32 fire control and guidance radar vehicle

The TEL vehicles are tracked based on a GM-123 chassis and carry two missiles each on an elevating turntable for up to 360-degree rotation and 70-degree elevation. The two primary versions of the missile in service are the 9M8M1 (former designation 3M8M1) (2K11M "Krug-M") and 9M8M2 (former designation 3M8M2) (2K11M2/3 "Krug-M1"), both of which are believed to be known to the US DoD as SA-4B. The original 9M8 (former designation 3M8) (SA-4A) was first introduced into service in 1965 and followed by the upgraded 9M8M (2K11A "Krug-A") in 1967 before the 9M8M1 in 1971 and the 9M8M2 in 1973. The 9M8M2 actually has a lower maximum engagement altitude and shorter range in exchange for better performance in engaging aircraft close to the battery. Each battery typically consists of two 9M8M1 missiles and four 9M8M2 missiles as well as the following radars:

- P-40 (1S12) E-band early warning radar (also used by the 2K12 Kub and 9K33 Osa, range 175 km/108 miles) (modified AT-Ts), in divisions command post
- 1S32 H-band continuous wave fire control and guidance radar (range 128 km/80 miles)
- PRV-9 E-band height finding radar (also used by the 2K12 Kub and 9K33 Osa, range 240 km/148 miles), in regiments or brigades command post

The P-40 radar is mounted on a modified AT-T vehicle. The launchers (2P24) and 1S32 radar are mounted on GM-123/ GM-124. The PRV-9 radar is mounted on a truck. Batteries may also feature Ural 375D trucks 2T6 carrying spare missiles for reloading the launchers.

=== Missile ===
9M8
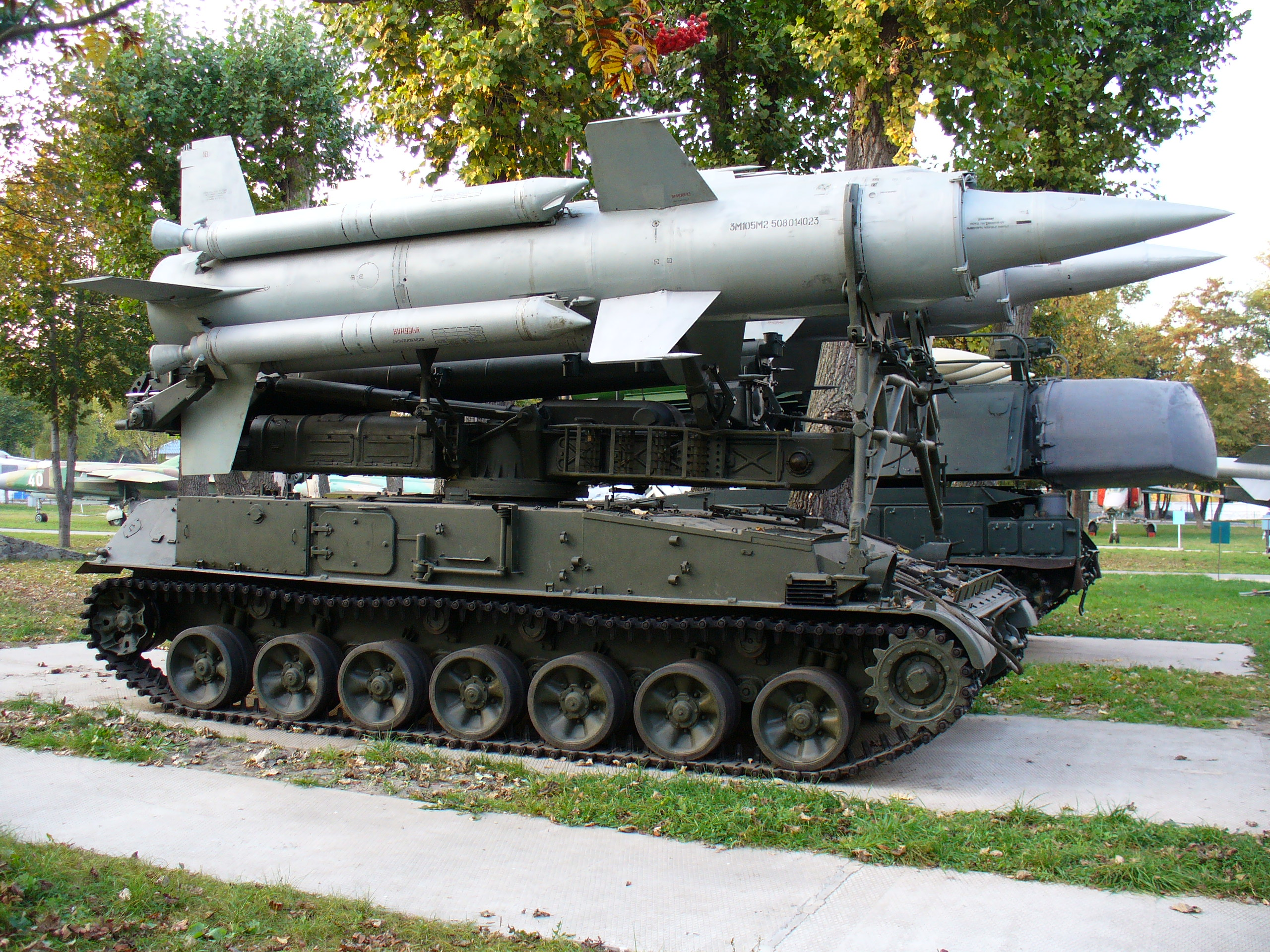
- TEL at Ukrainian Air Force Museum in Vinnitsa.
- Type: Surface-to-air missile
- Place of origin: Soviet Union

Production history
- Variants: 3M8 (later 9M8) Krug, 9M8M Krug-M, 9M8M1 Krug-M1, 9M8M2 Krug-M2, 9M8M3 Krug-M3.

Specifications (9M331)
- Mass: 2,453 kg (5,408 lb)
- Length: 8,784 mm (28 ft 10 in)
- Diameter: 860 mm (2 ft 10 in)
- Warhead: Frag-HE
- Warhead weight: 150 kg (330 lb)
- Detonation mechanism: contact and proximity fuzes
- Propellant: kerosene fuelled ramjet
- Operational range: 55 kilometres (34 mi)
- Flight altitude: 24,500 metres (80,400 ft)
- Boost time: four solid fuel booster rocket motors
- Maximum speed: Mach 4
- Guidance system: Radio command

The missiles are launched with the aid of four solid rocket fuel rocket motors inside boosters attached to the outside of the missile. Once they have burned and the missile is aloft, a liquid-fuelled ramjet sustainer engine is ignited. It reaches speeds of up to Mach 4 and has an effective range of 50–55 km (31–34 miles) depending upon the version. It carries a 135 kg (300 lb) fragmentation warhead. Possible engagement altitudes range from 100 m to 27 km (330-88,500 feet). The 3M8 missile was designed and produced by NPO Novator.

Optical tracking is possible for guidance in a heavy ECM environment.

=== Survivability and anti-jamming capabilities ===
The Krug had several features that improved the survivability of the radar against anti-radiation missiles. In PI mode (ПИ) the system only briefly illuminated the target and the computer calculated its prolonged path based on data received from early warning radars. After a longer passive period the main radar illuminated the calculated flight direction of the target for a few seconds and recalculated the path of the target, if the distance between the calculated track and the actual position was greater than 7 km. As a result, the system emitted detectable signals only for a few seconds every few minutes, making it difficult to jam or launch an anti-radar missile against the Krug. The system was also able to track the target in full-passive automated PNS (ПHC) mode based on the data provided by "Long Track" mobile EWR via radio datalink. In this mode it was almost impossible to detect the Krug system until the moment of a missile launch, because the Krug did not emit radiation at all.

In 3M mode (3m aka three-point) the Krug could home on a jamming target (e.g., AN/ALQ-99). Jamming signals that were supposed to protect the aircraft made it into a target in this mode.

== Structure of Krug missile system ==
SAM-regiment have two SAM-battalions, SAM-brigade have three SAM-battalions. In each headquarter, brigade, regiment and battalion, is one command battery. In each SAM-battalion have three SAM-batteries.

- Self-propelled launch vehicle 2P24 on GM-123 base, three in each SAM- battery
- Rocket guidance station 1S32 on GM-124 base, one in each SAM- battery
- Target detection station 1S12 on modified AT-T base, one in each command battery
- Transporter-loader vehicle 2T6 on Ural truck base, one in each SAM- battery

== Variants ==
- 2K11A Krug A

2K11M
2K11M1

- M-31 Krug M – naval

== Operators ==
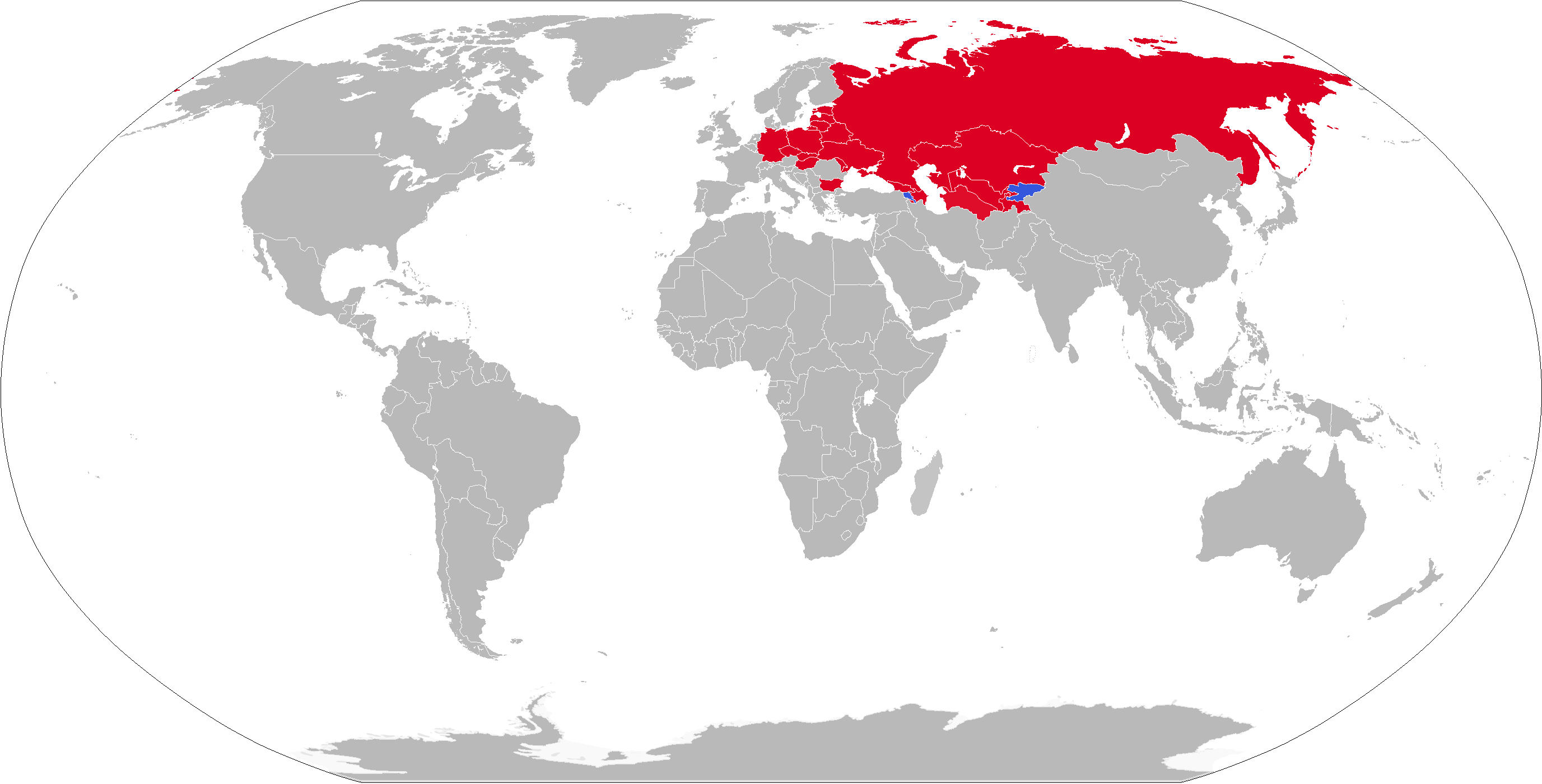
Operators Current Former

=== Current ===
- Armenia − 2 batteries as of 2026.
- Turkmenistan – 2 batteries as of 2026.

=== Former ===
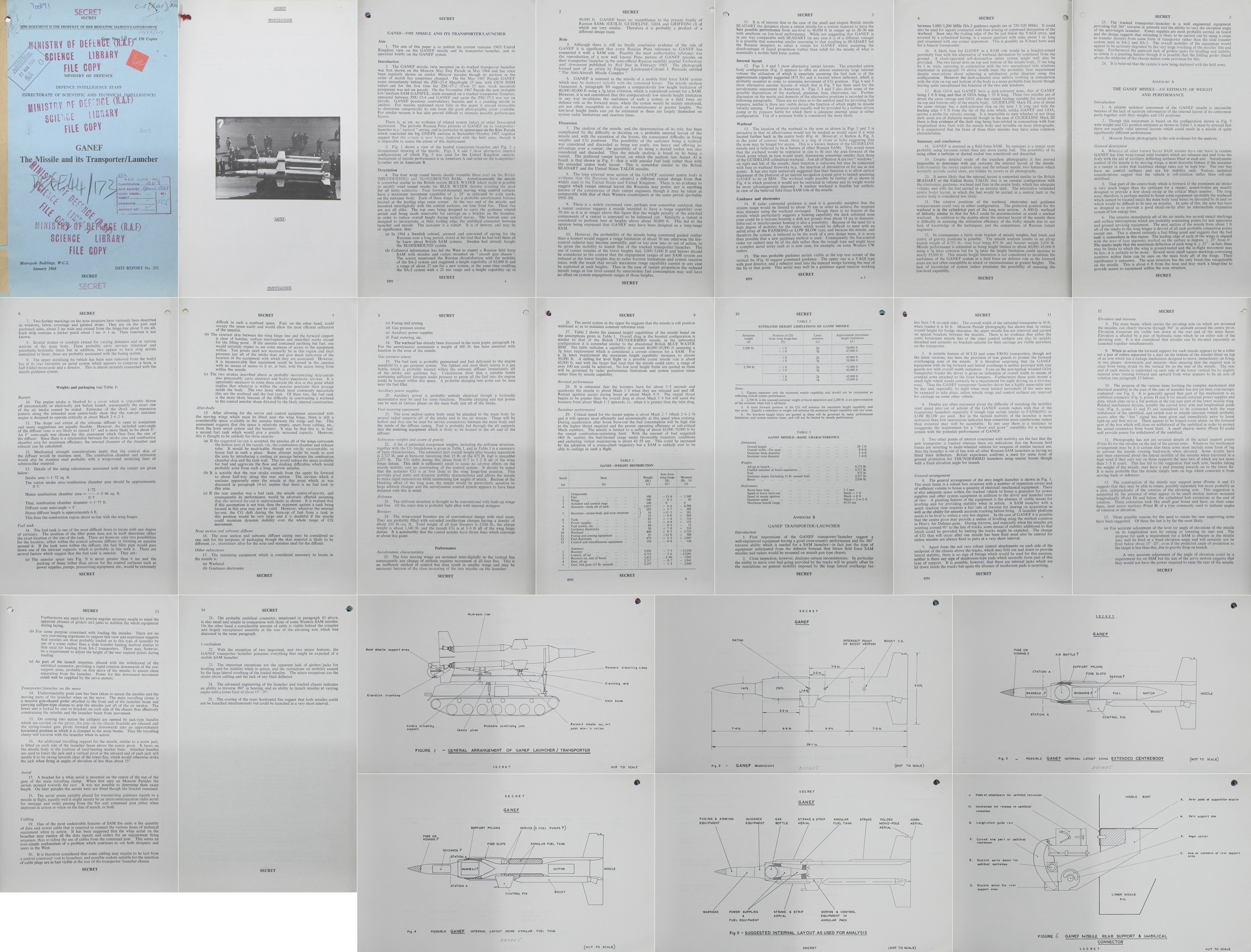
UK MoD Intelligence assessment dated 1968.

- Azerbaijan - Operated at least until 2021.
- Bulgaria – 30, in reserve
- Czechoslovakia - 9 batteries. Phased out in early 1990s.
- East Germany - Passed onto successor state.
- Germany – Phased out during the 1990s
- Georgia – Operated at least until 2008.
- Hungary - 18 batteries in 1991. Phased out in middle 1990s.
- Kazakhstan - Operated at least until 2021.
- Kyrgyzstan - Operated at least until 2021.
- Poland – 30. Phased out in 2011.
- Russia – 500 launchers (2007) (phased out in 1990s) Missiles used as targets for training(Virazh/-M 9M316M)
- Soviet Union - Passed on to successor states.
- Ukraine - 100 launchers in 2014. Phased out.
