= Egyptian Infantry Fighting Vehicle =

Egyptian Infantry Fighting Vehicle (EIFV)
- Type: Infantry fighting vehicle
- Place of origin: Egypt

Service history
- In service: trials in 1997
- Used by: Egyptian Army

Production history
- Designer: BAE Systems
- Manufacturer: Egyptian Tank Factory, Arab Organization for Industrialization
- Unit cost: $311,000
- Produced: 1996
- No. built: 1

Specifications
- Mass: 17.7 tons
- Length: 5.26 m
- Width: 2.82 m
- Height: 2.5 m
- Crew: 3+7
- Armor: Aluminum
- Main armament: 25 mm M242 Chain Gun; BGM-71 TOW II
- Secondary armament: 7.62 mm FN MAG
- Engine: Detroit Diesel 6V53TIA electronically controlled 400 hp at 2800 rpm
- Power/weight: 20.0 hp/ton
- Transmission: Hydrokinetic
- Suspension: torsion bar
- Fuel capacity: 454 liters
- Operational range: 482 km
- Maximum speed: 66 km/h

The Egyptian Infantry Fighting Vehicle (EIFV), also known as Infantry Fighting Vehicle Light (IFVL), is an Egyptian modification of the M113. It is a hybrid, based on an enlarged M113 chassis equipped with the complete two-man power-operated turret of the M2 Bradley IFV. The EIFV never entered production for the Egyptian Army.

== History ==
The EIFV was originally developed by BAE Systems, Ground Systems Division under contract to the Egyptian Ministry of Defense. It was developed to be a conversion of the M113, of which the Egyptian Army has a total of 2,650, as well as an additional 1,200 AIFVs (modified M113s), but it can also be produced as new vehicles. Design activities first commenced in 1995, and the first prototype was assembled in the Egyptian Military Plant 200 where assembly of the M1 Abrams is carried out for the Egyptian Army. The first prototype was completed by Egyptian Military Plant 200 in 1996 and performance validation trials were completed in mid-1997. The EIFV has not entered production.

== Description ==
The EIFV has three crewman, and can carry six soldiers, who enter the vehicle via a rear drop ramp. The driver is seated at the left front of the hull with the engine compartment to his right. The driver has a single-piece pop-up hatch cover which rotates over the engine cooling air intake grill when open, and is provided with four, day periscopes for observation. The commander and the gunner are both positioned in the turret itself, and a hatch is provided for the commander on the turret roof.

=== Armor ===
The M113 chassis is enlarged to accommodate several modifications and to allow for more armor to be added. The hull of the EIFV is of all-welded 5083 aluminum armour which provides protection from small arms fire and shell splinters, able to defeat armour-piercing projectiles up to 14.5 mm in calibre over a 360° arc of attack. Aluminum provides protection similar to that of steel armor while keeping the vehicle lightweight. An armor upgrade package produced by the AOI can significantly enhance the armor on the EIFV even further, allowing it to withstand armor-piercing 23 mm rounds, without sacrificing the vehicle's mobility. Optional upgrades for the vehicle include air conditioning, NBC protection and firing ports.

=== Maneuverability ===
To cope with the increased size and armor of the vehicle, a more powerful 400 hp Detroit Diesel 6V53TIA turbocharged/aftercooled diesel engine is installed in place of the original 275 hp engine on the M113, giving a power-to-weight ratio of 20 hp/ton. This is coupled to an Allison X200 cross-drive, four-speed Hydrokinetic transmission. As a result of the longer chassis and improved engine a sixth road wheel is added (the M113 only has five). As an option the vehicle can be fitted with 350 hp. The modifications allows the EIFV to keep up in terms of speed and mobility with modern tanks such as the M1A1/A2 Abrams, which are used by the Egyptian Army, despite the added weight. The vehicle can traverse slopes up to 80%, side slopes of 40%, trenches 2200 mm wide, and vertical obstacles with a height of 710 mm.

=== Armament ===
The M2 Bradley turret provides the EIFV with considerable firepower on a cheap M113 chassis, and allows it to engage personnel, armored vehicles and tanks, as well as low flying targets and helicopters. It has the same fire control and stabilization features on the M2 Bradley. The armament consists of the 25 mm M242 chain gun with 800 rounds and an effective range of 3000 m, and a coaxial 7.62 mm machine gun with 2,100 rounds. Using armor-piercing rounds, the chain gun can engage armored vehicles and tanks. The turret also has a two-tube TOW launcher, capable of launching TOW II ATGM missiles, which can destroy most tanks at a maximum range of 3750 m, enabling the vehicle to be used in an anti tank role. The only major drawback is that the missiles can only be launched when the vehicle is stationary. In addition to the two missiles in the launcher are four more missiles, stowed away inside the vehicle. The turret is standard equipped with passive IR and thermal imaging equipment.

== See also ==
- M113 APC
- AIFV
- Armoured warfare
- Infantry Fighting Vehicle
