= Mytishchi Machine-Building Plant =

Defense and automotive company in Mytishchi, Moscow Oblast, Russia

OJSC Mytishchi Machine-Building Plant
- Formerly: OKB-40
- Type: Open joint-stock company
- Industry: Defense industry Automotive industry
- Founded: 1897; 2009
- Headquarters: Mytishchi, Russia
- Products: Military vehicles, dump trucks
- Revenue: $112 million (2015)
- Operating income: $15.1 million (2015)
- Net income: $11.3 million (2015)
- Total assets: $194 million (2015)
- Total equity: $62.3 million (2015)
- Owner: Kalashnikov Concern (100%)
- Website: mmzavod.ru

OJSC Mytishchi Machine-Building Plant (Russian: Мытищинский машиностроительный завод) is a Russian manufacturer of dump trucks and armored tracked vehicles, with its headquarters in Mytishchi. The plant was formerly part of Metrowagonmash, from which it was spun off in 2009. As of 2016, it is managed by Kalashnikov Concern.

OSJC Mytishchi Machine-Building Plant has produced air defense vehicles for the military and has a design bureau for development of these weapons. It also makes products for the civilian automotive industry.

The factory was a major supplier of anti-aircraft materiel for the Soviet Union in World War II.

== Products ==
- ASU-57
- ASU-85
- GM chassis
- ZSU-23-4
- ZSU-37
