= Viktor Pavlovich Potapov =

Soviet and Russian military officer (1934–2021)

- Native name: Виктор Павлович Потапов
- Born: 7 January 1934; Muratovka, Mokshansky District, Middle Volga Krai, Russian SFSR, Soviet Union
- Died: 23 June 2021 (aged 87) Moscow, Russia
- Buried: Troyekurovskoye Cemetery
- Allegiance: Soviet Union; Russia
- Branch: Soviet Naval Aviation; Russian Naval Aviation
- Service years: 1951–1995
- Rank: Colonel General of Aviation
- Commands: Northern Fleet Naval Aviation; Soviet Naval Aviation; Russian Naval Aviation
- Awards: Order of the October Revolution; Order of the Red Banner; Order of the Red Star; Order "For Service to the Homeland in the Armed Forces of the USSR" Second and Third Classes

Viktor Pavlovich Potapov (Russian: Виктор Павлович Потапов; 7 January 1934 – 23 June 2021) was an officer of the Soviet military who held a number of posts in naval aviation, serving as the last head of Soviet Naval Aviation, and the first head of Russian Naval Aviation, reaching the rank of Colonel General.

Born in 1934, Potapov became interested in aviation at an early age. He joined a flying club while in school, experience which stood him in good stead when he enrolled in the Levanevsky Naval Torpedo Aviation School in 1951. Training on the Yakovlev Yak-18 and Tupolev Tu-2 propeller-driven aircraft, and the Ilyushin Il-28 jet torpedo bomber, Potapov was assigned to the Black Sea Fleet Air Force. He continued to develop his skills on the latest military aircraft entering service, and rose through the ranks and positions.

Transferring to the Northern Fleet Naval Aviation in 1966, Potapov commanded, and helped establish aviation regiments. After studies at the Military Academy of the General Staff of the Armed Forces, he was appointed to command the Northern Fleet's Naval Aviation. In 1986, he was appointed first deputy commander, and in 1988 commander of Soviet Naval Aviation. After the dissolution of the Soviet Union, he continued as the first commander of the successor force, Russian Naval Aviation, until his retirement in 1994. He went on to work with a company manufacturing aviation radio-electronic systems, and died in 2021, having received numerous awards and honours over his career.

== Family and early life ==
Potapov was born into a peasant family on 7 January 1934 in the village of Muratovka, Mokshansky District, in what was then Middle Volga Krai in the Russian Soviet Federative Socialist Republic, part of the Soviet Union. Later that year his family moved to Tashkent, settling near an aircraft factory. Potapov grew up around aircraft, and reading the exploits of Soviet pilots such as Valery Chkalov, Mikhail Gromov and Konstantin Kokkinaki. In 1949, while still at school, Potapov entered the Tashkent flying club. He made his first independent flight the following year, in a Polikarpov Po-2, and remained at the flying club until his graduation from high school.

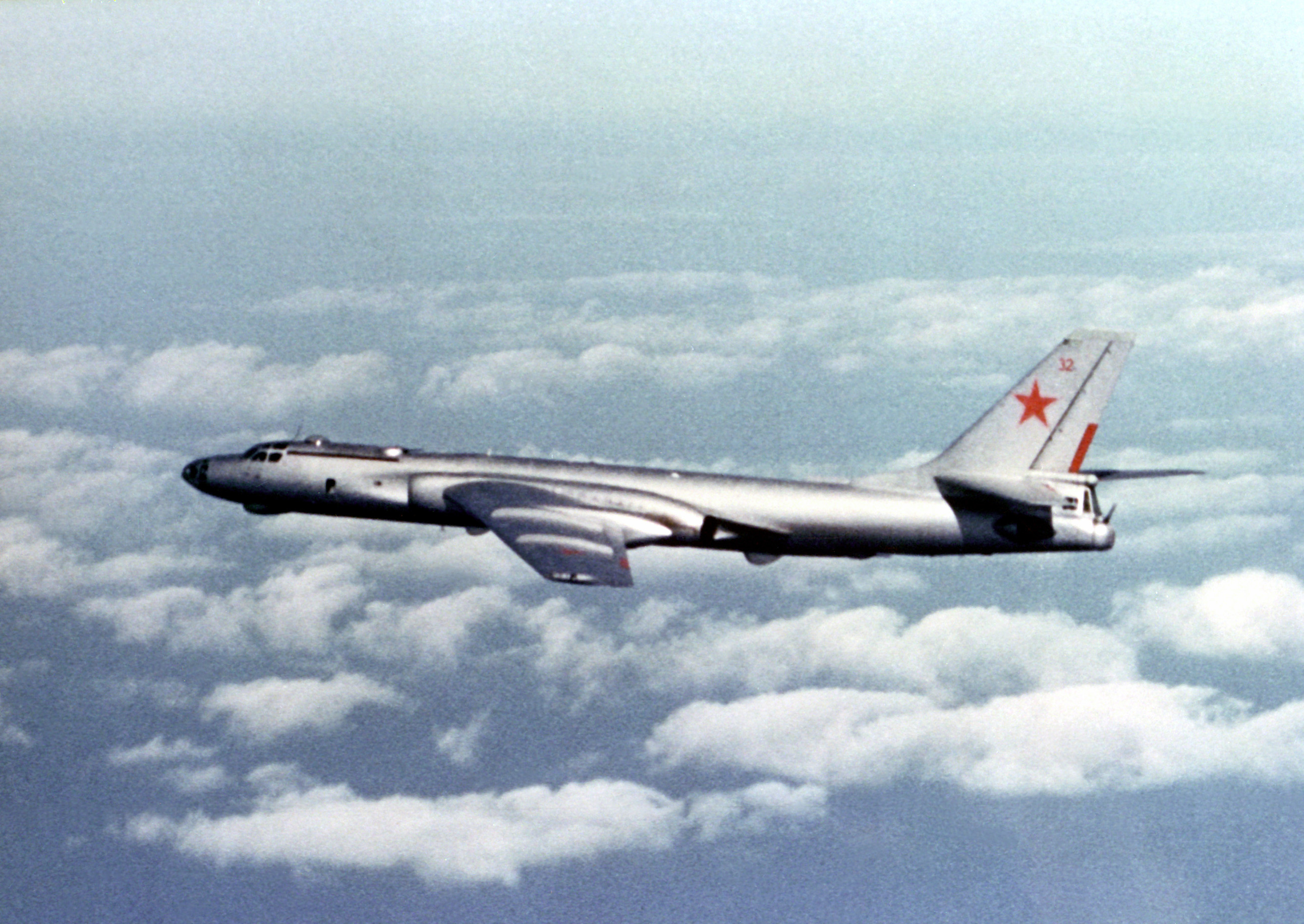
The Tupolev Tu-16 torpedo bomber. Potapov flew these aircraft during his time with the Black Sea Fleet Air Force.

With a certificate for his achievements, Potapov entered the Levanevsky Naval Torpedo Aviation School in Nikolayev in 1951. With his previous experience he was allowed to skip the second year of studies, and quickly mastered the Yakovlev Yak-18 and Tupolev Tu-2 propeller-driven aircraft, as well as the Ilyushin Il-28 jet torpedo bomber. After graduating in 1953 he was assigned to a torpedo aviation regiment of the Black Sea Fleet Air Force, where he continued to develop his skills on the new aircraft entering service. He became proficient on the Tupolev Tu-16 torpedo bomber in 1957, at the time the most advanced of its kind, before entering the aviation faculty of the Leningrad Naval Academy in 1959. He graduated with a gold medal in 1962, and returned to the Black Sea Fleet Air Force, taking charge of a squadron in naval missile-armed aviation regiment.

== Commands ==
In February 1966, Potapov was appointed deputy commander of the 392nd Separate Long-Range Reconnaissance Aviation Regiment, part of the Northern Fleet Naval Aviation, deployed at Kipelovo, later Fedotovo, in Vologda Oblast. The regiment was in the process of formation, equipped with Tupolev Tu-95RTs maritime reconnaissance aircraft. By late 1967, the regiment was fully operational, and in November that year, Potapov was instructed to form a new regiment at Fedotovo, operating the Ilyushin Il-38. These were maritime patrol aircraft equipped for anti-submarine warfare. Potapov succeeded in this task, and was awarded the Order of the Red Star, while the regiment, the 24th Anti-Submarine Regiment was rated excellent in 1969.

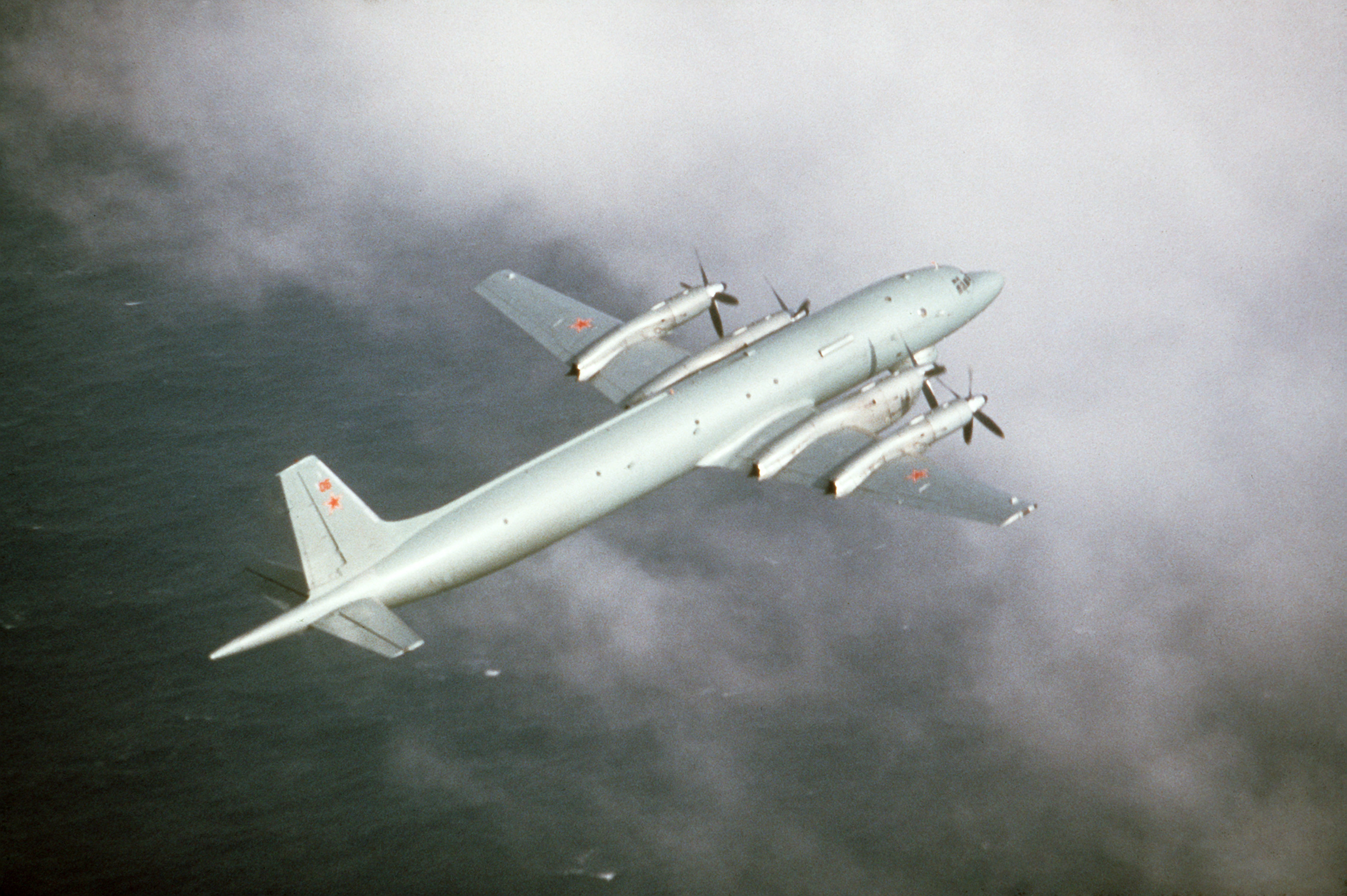
An Ilyushin Il-38. Potapov was instructed to form a new regiment operating these aircraft in 1967. Fifty years later, he was honoured with the renaming of a refurbished Il-38 after him.

In February 1971, Potapov was appointed commander of the 5th Naval Missile Division of the Northern Fleet, and was promoted to Major General on 2 November 1972. Over his flying career, he participated in missions in the Central and South Atlantic using airfields in Cuba, Angola and Guinea. Between 1976 and 1978, he was deputy commander of the Northern Fleet Air Force. He took part in the first operation on the mass use of aviation of the Northern Fleet Air Force for operational and strategic purposes, involving 104 aircraft flying in the North Atlantic. He enrolled in the Military Academy of the General Staff of the Armed Forces in 1978, again graduating with a gold medal in 1980 and being appointed commander of the Northern Fleet Air Force. He was promoted to Lieutenant General on 10 February 1981, and then to Colonel General on 29 April 1985. In 1986 he was appointed first deputy commander, and in 1988 commander of Soviet Naval Aviation. He held the post during the dissolution of the Soviet Union in 1991, and continued as the first commander of the successor force, Russian Naval Aviation, until his retirement in 1994.

== Awards and later life ==
In retirement, Potapov was director of the Moscow branch of the holding company "Leninets", which manufactured aviation radio-electronic systems. Over his career, he had received the Order of the Red Banner, the Order of the Red Star, and the Order "For Service to the Homeland in the Armed Forces of the USSR", Second and Third Classes. In 1975, he received the title of Honoured Military Pilot of the USSR. On 31 January 2017, he was honoured with the naming of a refurbished Il-38N "Viktor Potapov". Potapov, who had overseen the introduction of the first Il-38s fifty years earlier, attended the event, held in Zhukovsky. Over his career, he had mastered the operation of eight types of aircraft.

Potapov died in Moscow on 23 June 2021 at the age of 87, and was buried in the Troyekurovskoye Cemetery.
