= Soviet Naval Aviation =

Aerial warfare branch of the Soviet Navy

- Морская авиация Военно-морского флота; Morskaya aviatsiya Voenno-morskogo flota
- Soviet naval ensign (1950–1992)
- Active: 1918–1992
- Country: Russian SFSR (1918–1922); Soviet Union (1922–1991); CIS (1991–1992)
- Branch: Red Fleet (1918–1920); Red Air Force (1920–1935); Soviet Navy (1935–1992)
- Type: Naval aviation
- Engagements: Russian Civil War; Winter War; Great Patriotic War; Soviet–Japanese War; Korean War; Cold War

Commanders
- Notable commanders: Colonel General Viktor Potapov; Marshal Semyon Zhavoronkov

Insignia
- Roundel and fin flash (since 1945)

- Roundel and fin flash (until 1945)

- Roundel and fin flash (1920s and 1930s variant)

The Soviet Naval Aviation (Russian: Морская авиация Военно-морского флота СССР, romanized: Morskaya aviatsiya Voenno-morskogo flota SSSR, lit. 'Naval Aviation of the Soviet Navy'; abbr. МА ВМФ СССР, MA VMF SSSR) was the naval aviation arm of the Soviet Navy.

== Origins ==
The first naval aviation units in the Russian Empire were formed in 1912–1914 as a part of the Baltic Fleet and the Black Sea Fleet of the Imperial Russian Navy. During World War I, the seaplane units were used on the Black Sea for conducting reconnaissance aircraft bombing and firing at coastal and port installations and enemy ships, and destroying enemy submarines at sea and aircraft on airfields.

== Russian Civil War and interwar period ==
The regular Soviet naval aviation units were created in 1918. They participated in the Russian Civil War, cooperating with Red ground and naval forces during the combats at Petrograd, on the Baltic and Black Seas, on the Volga, Kama, and Northern Dvina Rivers, and on Lake Onega. The newborn Soviet Naval Aviation consisted of only 76 obsolete seaplanes. Scanty and technically imperfect, it was mostly used for resupplying Reds' watercraft and ground units.

In the second half of the 1920s, the Soviet Naval Aviation order of battle began to grow. It received new reconnaissance seaplanes, bombers, and fighters. In the mid-1930s, the Soviets created naval air forces in the Baltic, Black Sea, Pacific Fleets, and the Northern Flotilla. The importance of naval aviation had grown significantly by 1938–1940, to become one of the main components of the Soviet Navy. By this time, the Soviets had created bomber and torpedo bomber naval air units and formations. At the beginning of the Great Patriotic War, all Soviet fleets (except for the Pacific Fleet) and flotillas had a total of 1,445 aircraft.

== Second World War ==
The Soviet Naval Air Force (Russian: Военно-воздушные силы Военно-морского флота СССР, romanized: Voenno-vozdushnye sily Voenno-morskogo flota SSSR; abbr. ВВС ВМФ СССР, VVS VMF SSSR) was the Soviet Navy's air service during World War II. Such air units provided air support to Soviet Navy fleets and flotillas in the theaters of operations in the Barents, Baltic and Black Seas and also to the Soviet Pacific Fleet in the Seas of Okhotsk and of Japan.

The Soviet Naval Air Force managed all ship-based (catapult-launched from dreadnoughts and cruisers) and land-based seaplanes (including flying boats) and other naval aircraft. Soviet naval air units also conducted land operations in support of the Red Army during naval landings and served in special wartime operations. Naval Aviation provided some air cover to Allied Arctic convoys bringing Lend-Lease equipment to the Soviet Union via the Barents Sea to Northern Russia.

In particular, the Soviet Naval Air Force was deployed in defense of Odessa (August–October 1941) and of Sevastopol (October 1941 – July 1942), in operations in the Azov and Black Seas and in Crimea (October 1941 – July 1942, November 1943, April–May 1944), and it carried out successful airstrikes in other battles on the Eastern Front and in a final stage of the Pacific Theater campaign of World War II.

During the war, the Soviet Naval Aviation delivered an immense blow to the enemy in terms of sunken ships and their crews—two and a half times more than any other unit of the Soviet Navy. Seventeen naval air units were honored with the title of the Soviet Guards, while 241 airmen were awarded with the title of the Hero of the Soviet Union (including five naval pilots twice).

=== Aviation divisions of the Red Navy ===
- 1st Guards Fighter Aviation Division VVS VMF
- 2nd Torpedo Rananskaya Red Banner Aviation Division in the name of N.A. Ostryakova VVS VMF
- 3rd Bombardment Aviation Division VVS VMF
- 4th Bombardment Aviation Division VVS VMF
- 5th Torpedo Aviation Division VVS VMF
- 6th Bombardment Aviation Division VVS VMF
- 7th Bombardment Aviation Division VVS VMF
- 8th Torpedo Gatchinskaya Red Banner Aviation Division VVS VMF
- 9th Assault Ropshinskaya Red Banner, Order of Ushakov Aviation Division VVS VMF
- 10th Seysinskaya Red Banner Aviation Division of Dive Bombers VVS VMF
- 11th Assault Novorossiysk Twice Red Banner Aviation Division VVS VMF
- 12th Assault Aviation Division VVS VMF
- 13th Aviation Division of Dive Bombers VVS VMF
- 14th Mixed Aviation Division VVS VMF
- 15th Mixed Aviation Division VVS VMF
- 16th Mixed Aviation Division VVS VMF – 1 May 1961 became 143rd Maritime Rocket Aviation Division

== Cold War ==
To attack surface ships at long ranges, the Soviet Navy was unique in deploying large numbers of bombers in a maritime role for use by the Soviet Naval Air Force. The Soviet Kiev-class aircraft carriers was deployed in the late 1970s and carried up to 30 aircraft including Yak-38 VTOL strike aircraft. The next class of Soviet aircraft carriers, named the Kuznetsov class, supported more conventional aircraft such as the Su-27K "Flanker-D" and the MiG-29K "Fulcrum-D". Land-based aircraft such as the Tupolev Tu-16 "Badger" and Tu-22M "Backfire" bombers were deployed with high-speed anti-ship missiles. Previously believed to be interceptors of NATO supply convoys traveling the sea lines of communication across the North Atlantic Ocean between Europe and North America, the primary role of these aircraft was to protect the Soviet mainland from attacks by U.S. carrier task forces. Tupolev Tu-22R reconnaissance aircraft could be fitted with an aerial refueling probe that was subsequently fitted to most Tu-22s, expanding their radius of operation. A total of 127 Tu-22Rs were built, 62 of which went to the Soviet Naval Air Force for maritime patrol use.

The last commander of the Soviet Naval Air Force, Colonel General Viktor Pavlovich Potapov, was appointed in 1988.

== Inventory ==
The Soviet Naval Aviation in 1990:

=== Ship-based aircraft ===
- 79 VTOL strike aircraft
  - 79 Yakovlev Yak-38s
- 219 naval helicopters
  - 113 Kamov Ka-25s
  - 106 Kamov Ka-27s

=== Land-based aircraft ===
- 269 bombers
  - 125 Tupolev Tu-16s
  - 15 Tupolev Tu-22s
  - 129 Tupolev Tu-22Ms
- 198 attack aircraft
  - 97 Sukhoi Su-17s
  - 101 Sukhoi Su-24s
- 90 anti-submarine warfare (ASW) aircraft
  - 50 Tupolev Tu-142s
  - 40 Ilyushin Il-38s
- 65 reconnaissance aircraft
  - 50 Tupolev Tu-16s
  - 15 Antonov An-12s
- 45 electronic-warfare aircraft
  - 10 Tupolev Tu-22s
  - 20 Tupolev Tu-95s
  - 15 Sukhoi Su-24s
- 90 seaplanes
  - 90 Beriev Be-12s
- 118 anti-submarine warfare helicopters
  - 118 Mil Mi-14s
- 40 tanker aircraft
  - Tupolev Tu-16N and Z

=== Other aircraft ===
- Mil Mi-8
- Ilyushin Il-18

== Obsolete aircraft ==
=== Land-based aircraft ===
- Beriev Be-6 Madge
- Beriev Be-10 Mallow
- Ilyushin Il-28 Beagle
- Myasishchev M-4 Bison
- Tupolev Tu-14 Bosun

=== Helicopters ===
- Kamov Ka-10 Hat
- Kamov Ka-15 Hen
- Kamov Ka-18 Hog
- Mil Mi-4 Hound

== Weapons and equipment ==
=== Air-to-air missiles ===
- R-60, AA-8 Aphid

=== Air-to-surface missiles ===
- K-10S, AS-2 Kipper
- Kh-22, AS-4 Kitchen
- Kh-23 Grom, AS-7 Kerry
- KS-1 Komet, AS-1 Kennel – obsolete missile system
- KSR-2, AS-5 Kelt
- KSR-5, AS-6 Kingfish

== Gallery ==
Interwar period

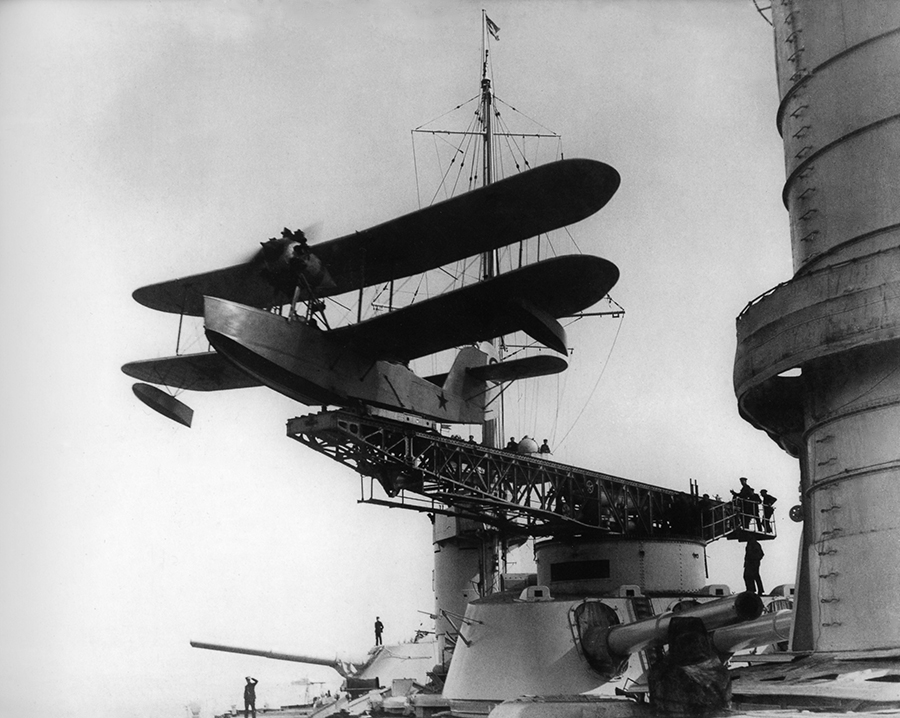
A Soviet Naval Aviation Heinkel KR-1 maritime patrol flying boat launches from a catapult mounted on a Parizhskaya Kommuna's 12-inch (305 mm) gun turret, 1930–1933

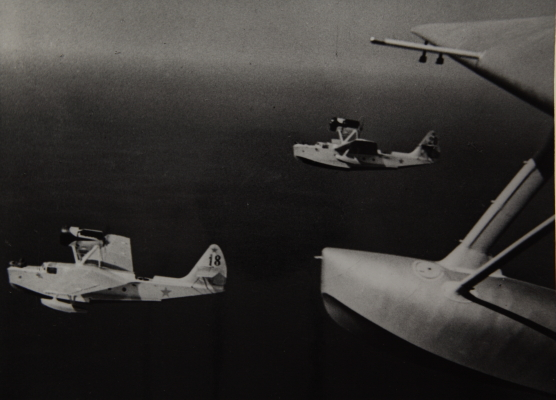
Soviet Naval Air Force Beriev MBR-2 maritime patrol flying boats are in flight, 1939

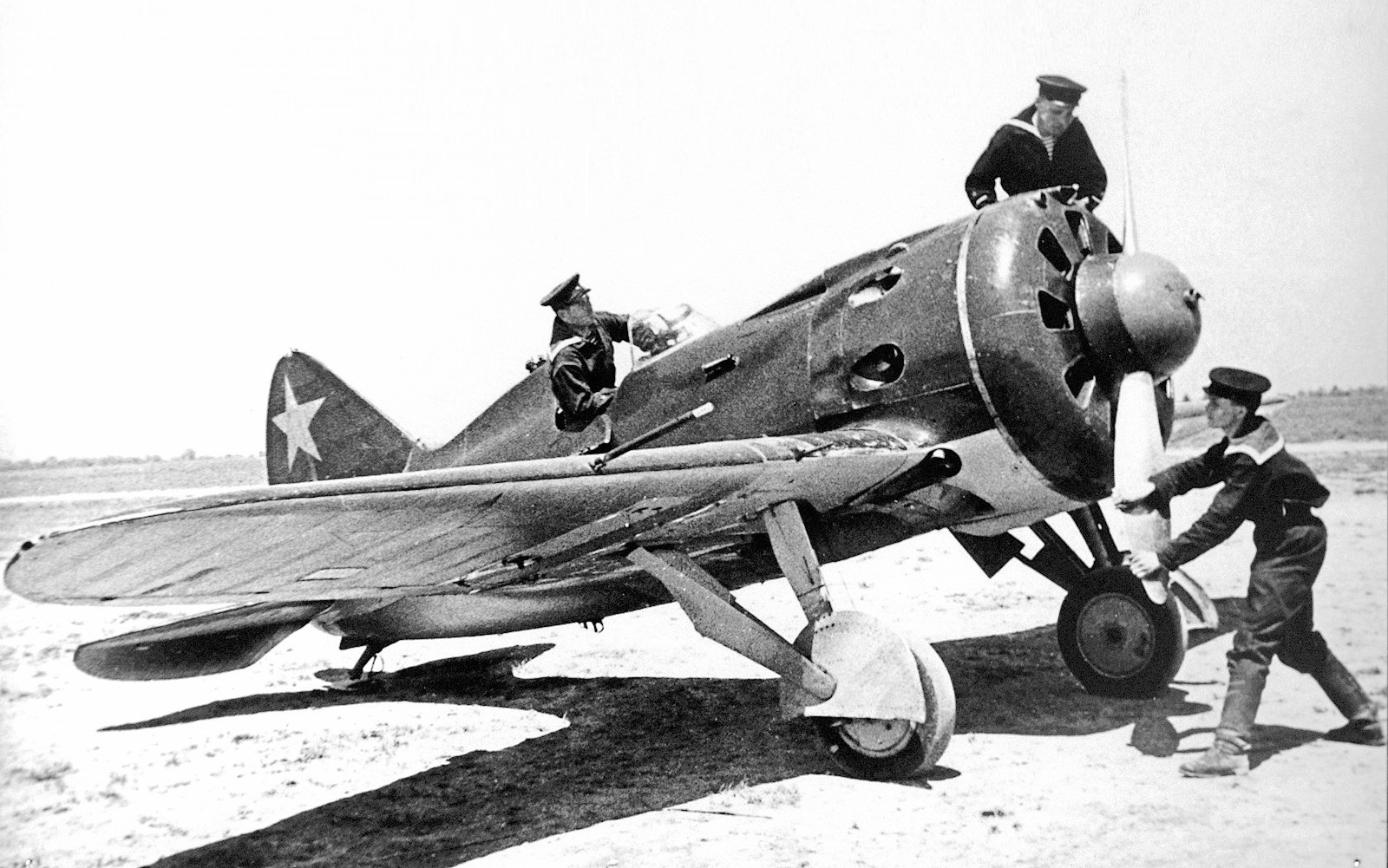
Aircraft maintenance technicians performing pre-flight preparation of a Soviet Naval Air Force Polikarpov I-16 fighter, a pre–World War II photo

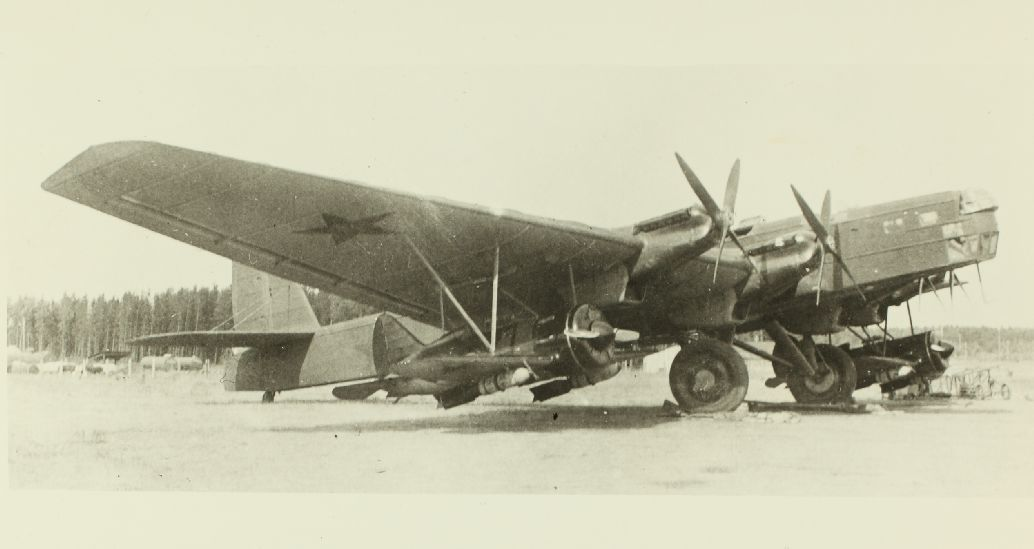
Zveno-SPB of the Black Sea Fleet Air Force: a Tupolev TB-3 4AM-34FRN mothership with two Polikarpov I-16 parasite fighters armed with FAB-250 bombs, a pre–World War II photo
World War II

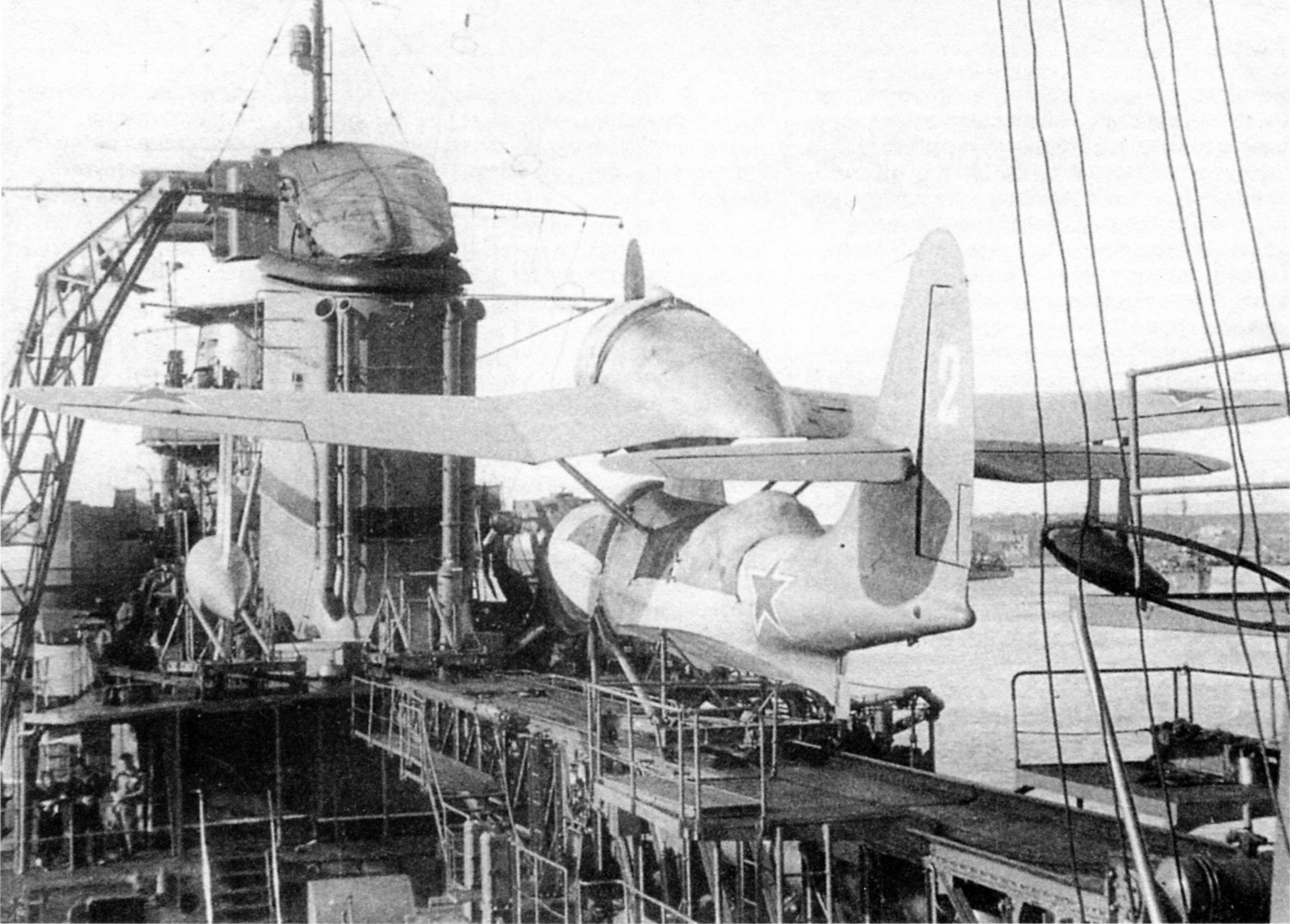
A Black Sea Fleet Air Force Beriev KOR-2 maritime patrol flying boat is on the Molotov's catapult, 1941

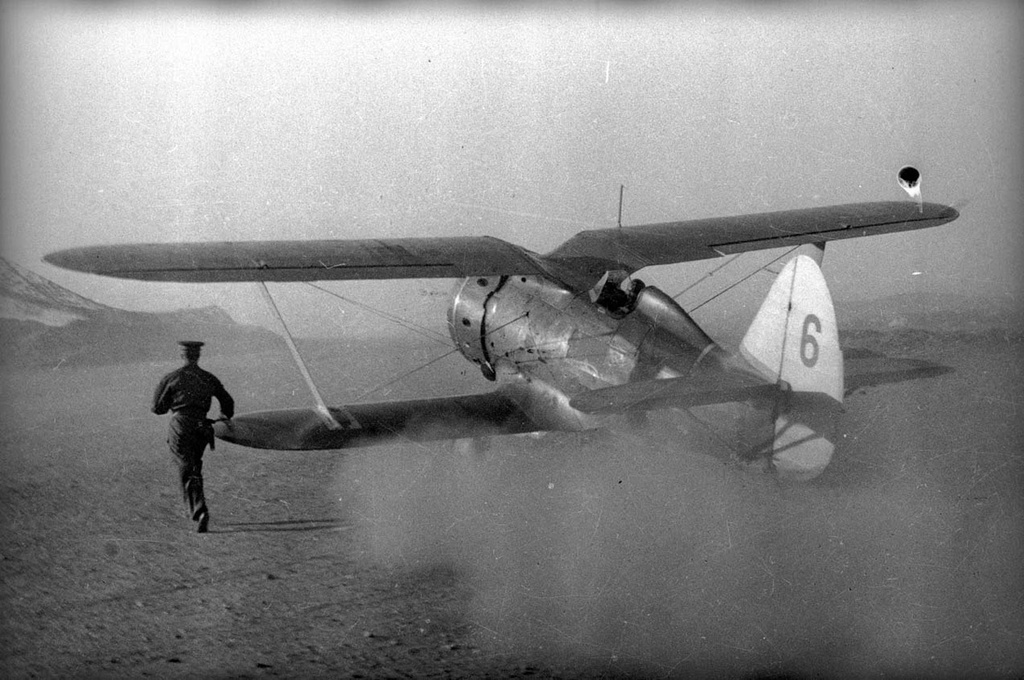
A Northern Fleet Air Force Polikarpov I-153 fighter taking-off from an airfield, 1941

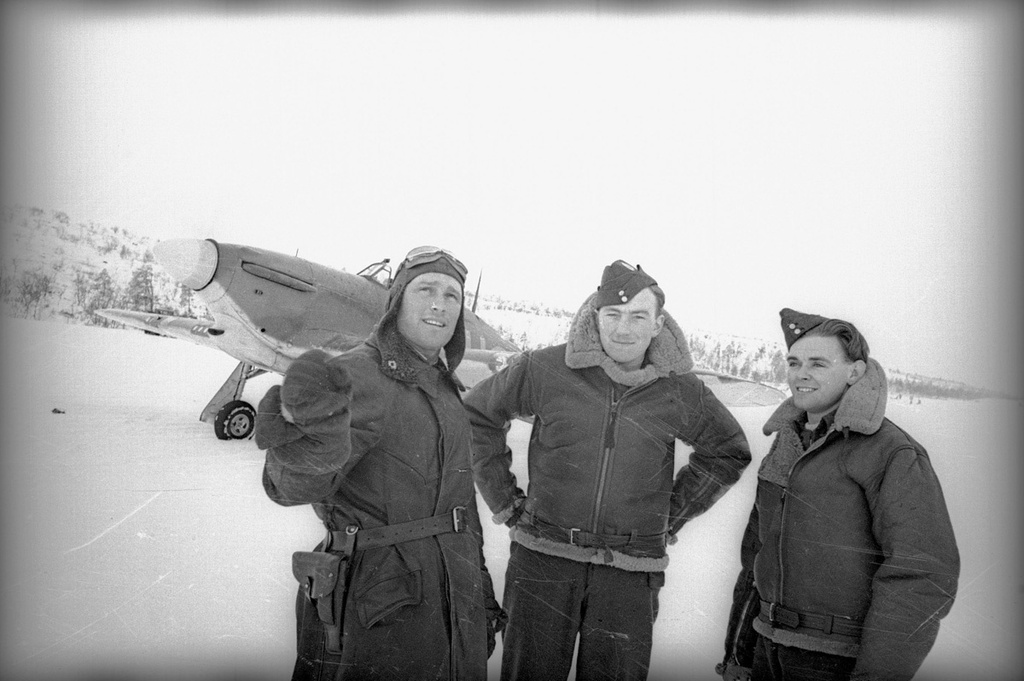
The Soviet naval fighter pilot Boris Safonov (left), along with the No. 151 Wing RAF airmen A. G. 'Tony' Miller (center) and C. 'Wag' Haw (right), and a Hawker Hurricane Mk IIB fighter (background) that would later be donated to the Northern Fleet Air Force after Operation Benedict; 1941

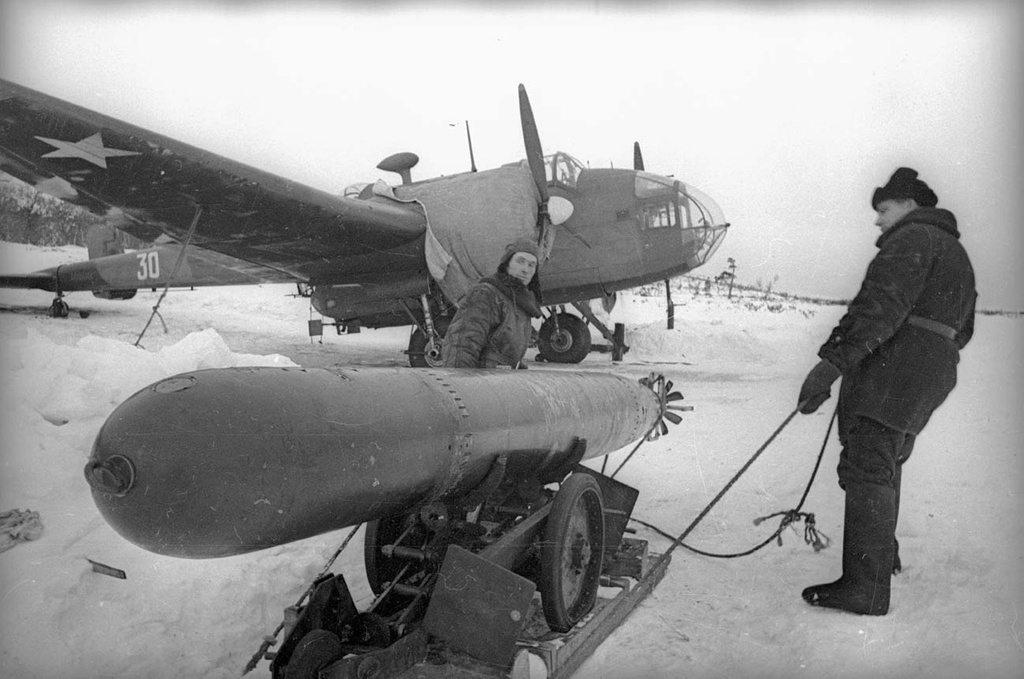
Weapons technicians preparing a 18-inch (450 mm) torpedo for arming a Handley Page Hampden TB Mk I torpedo bomber of the Northern Fleet Air Force 24th Mine-Torpedo Aviation Regiment—a former aircraft of No. 144 Squadron RAF or No. 455 Squadron RAAF—that was donated to the Soviet Union after Operation Orator; late 1942 and early 1943

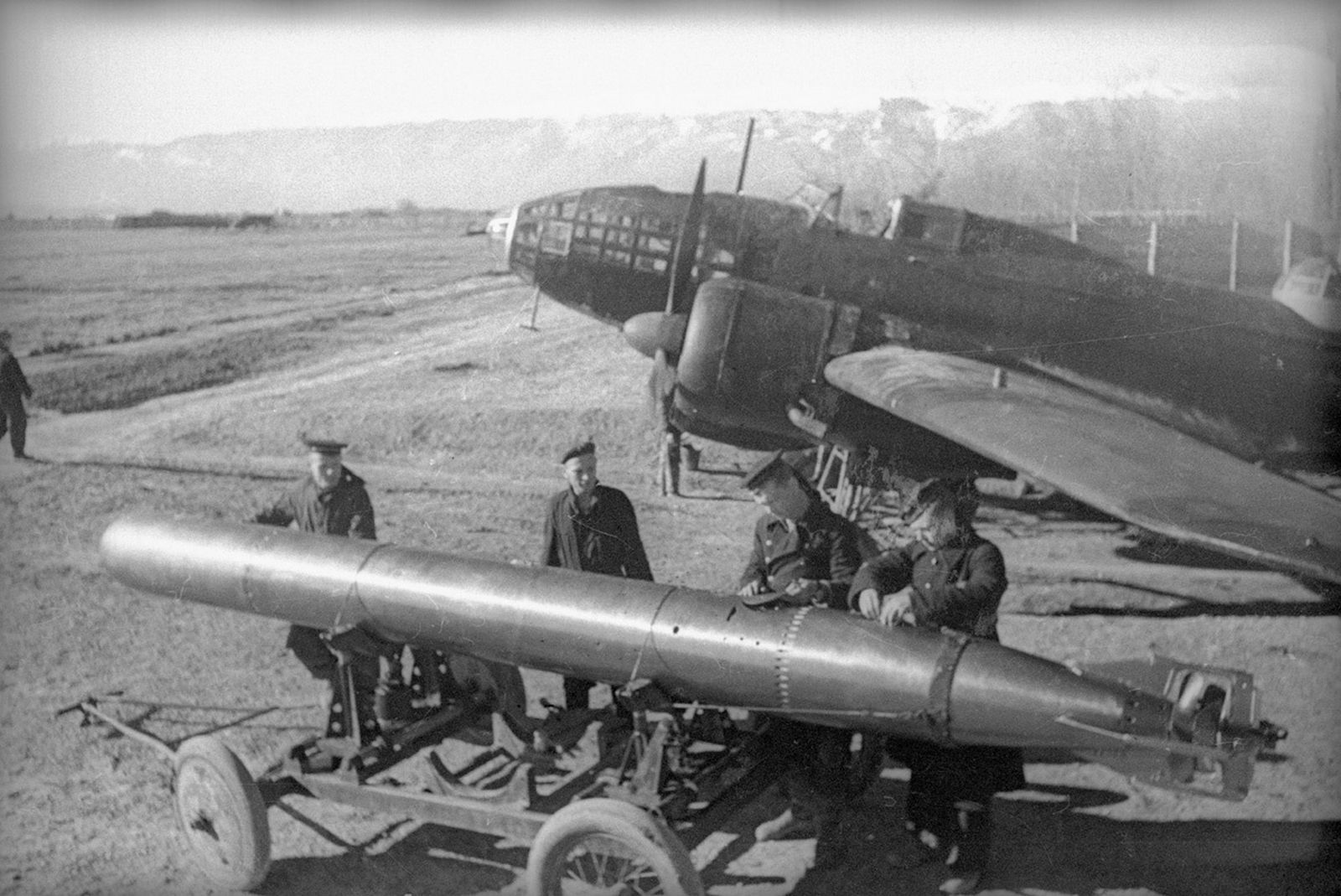
Weapons technicians preparing a 450 mm (18 in) torpedo for arming an Ilyushin Il-4T torpedo bomber of the Black Sea Fleet Air Force 5th Guards Mine-Torpedo Aviation Regiment, late 1942 and early 1943

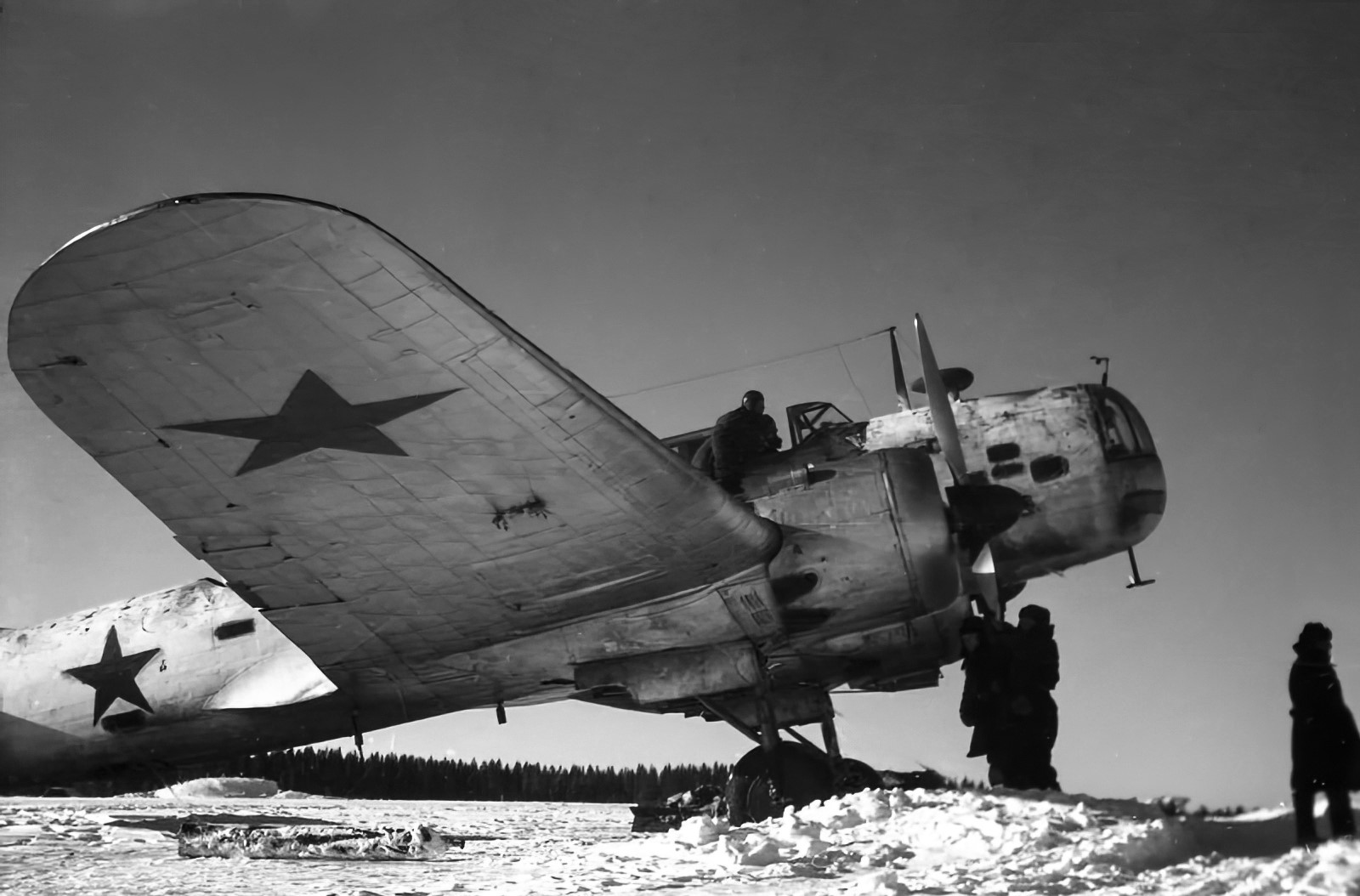
Aircraft maintenance technicians performing pre-flight preparation of an Ilyushin DB-3B torpedo bomber of the Baltic Fleet Air Force 1st Guards Mine-Torpedo Aviation Regiment, February 1943

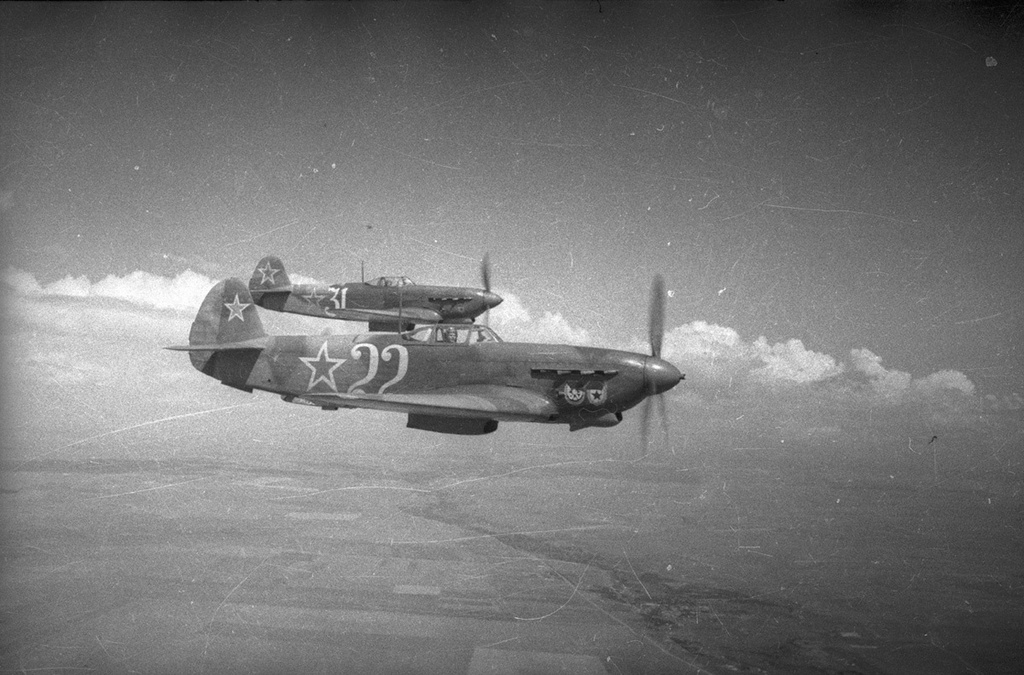
Yakovlev Yak-9D fighters from the Black Sea Fleet Air Force 6th Guards Fighter Aviation Regiment flying over Sevastopol, May 1944

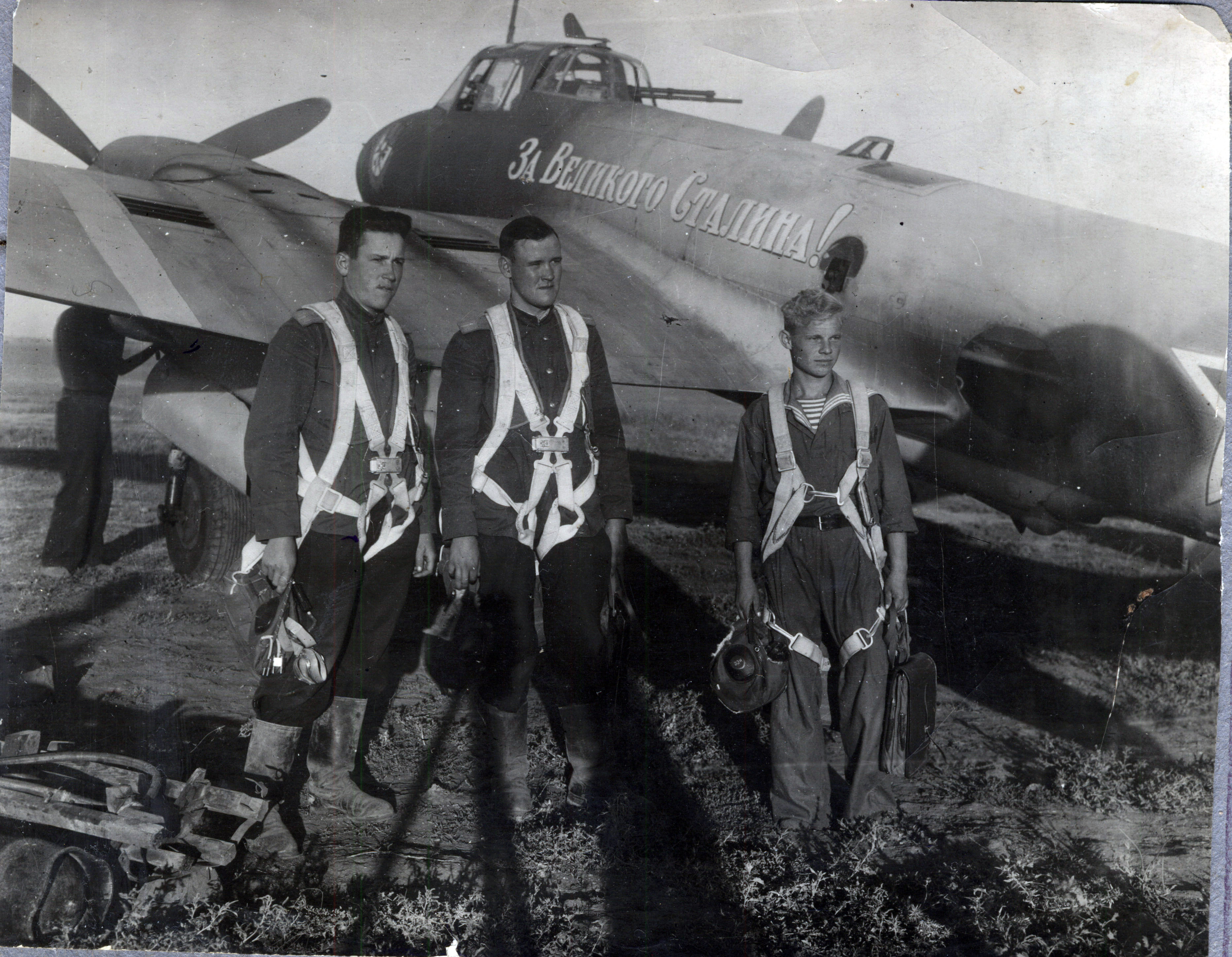
A Petlyakov Pe-2 aircrew from the Black Sea Fleet Air Force 40th Bomber Aviation Regiment, May 1944
Cold War

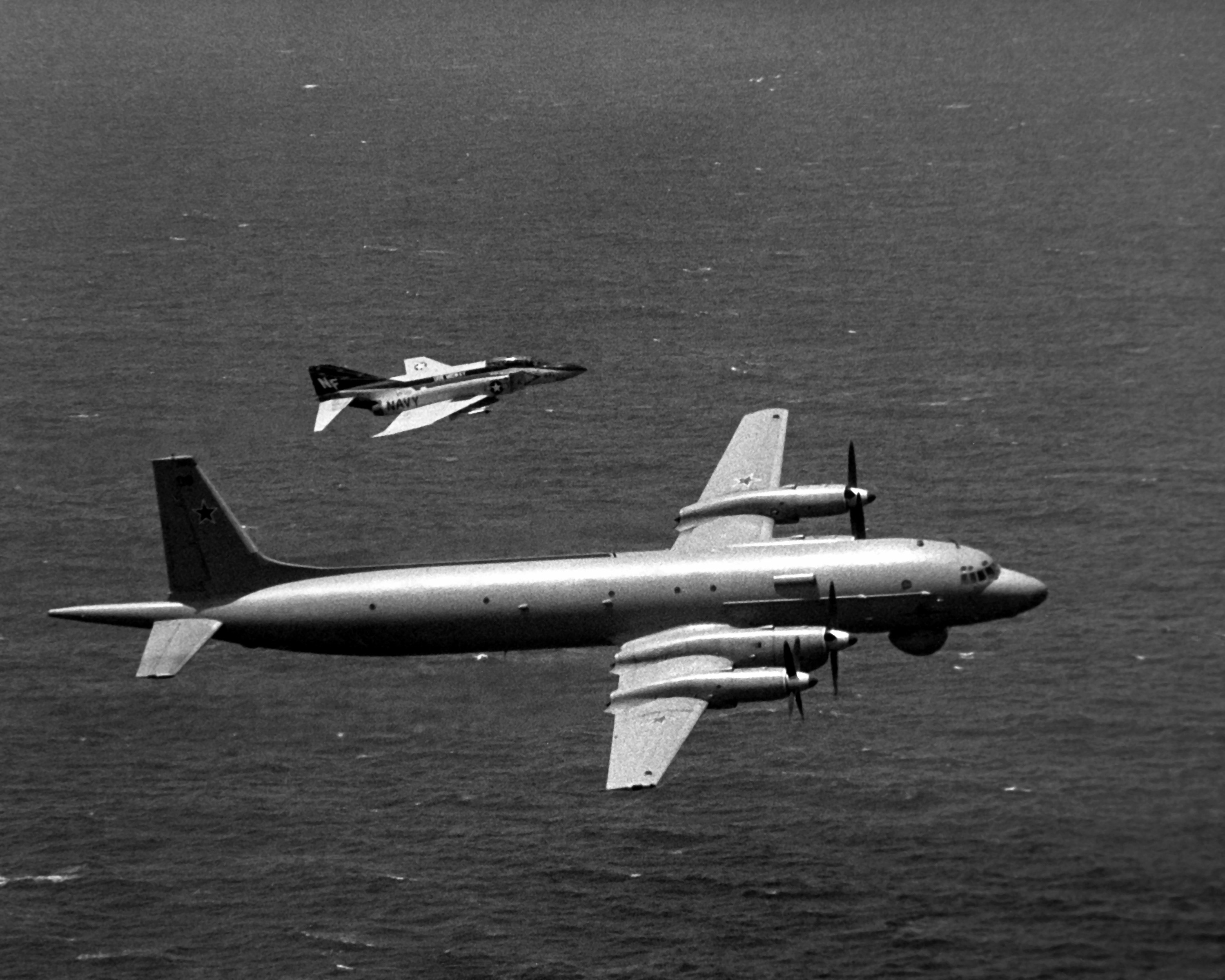
A U.S. Navy McDonnell Douglas F-4J Phantom II from VF-161 (background) intercepts a Soviet Pacific Fleet Air Force Ilyushin Il-38 maritime patrol aircraft over the Pacific Ocean, 1979

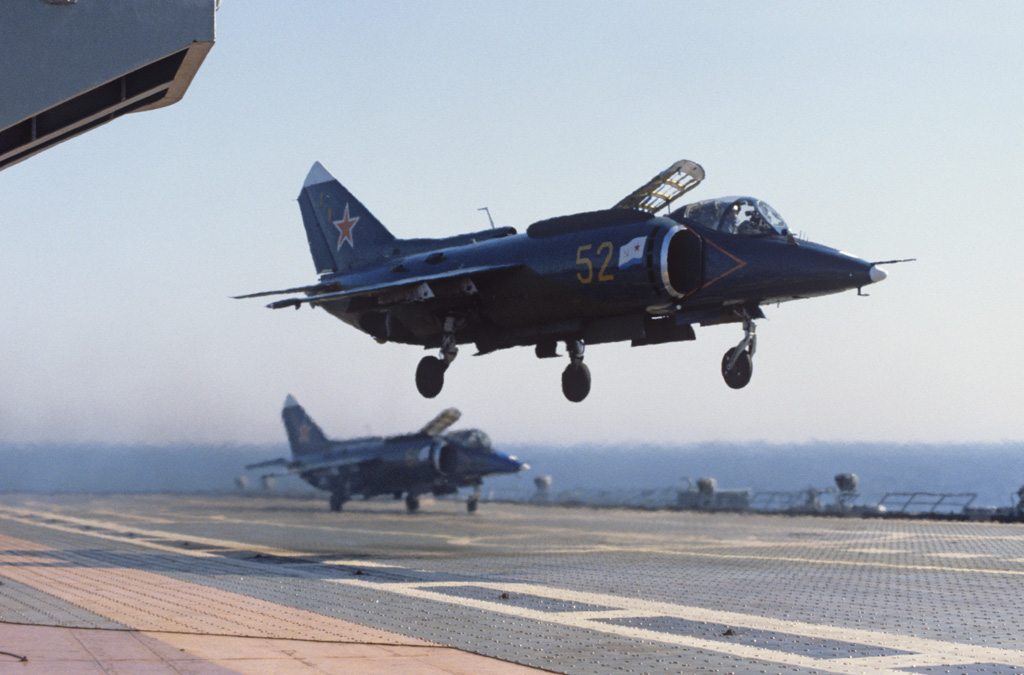
Pacific Fleet Air Force Yakovlev Yak-38 VTOL strike aircraft are on and over the Novorossiysk's flight deck, 1984

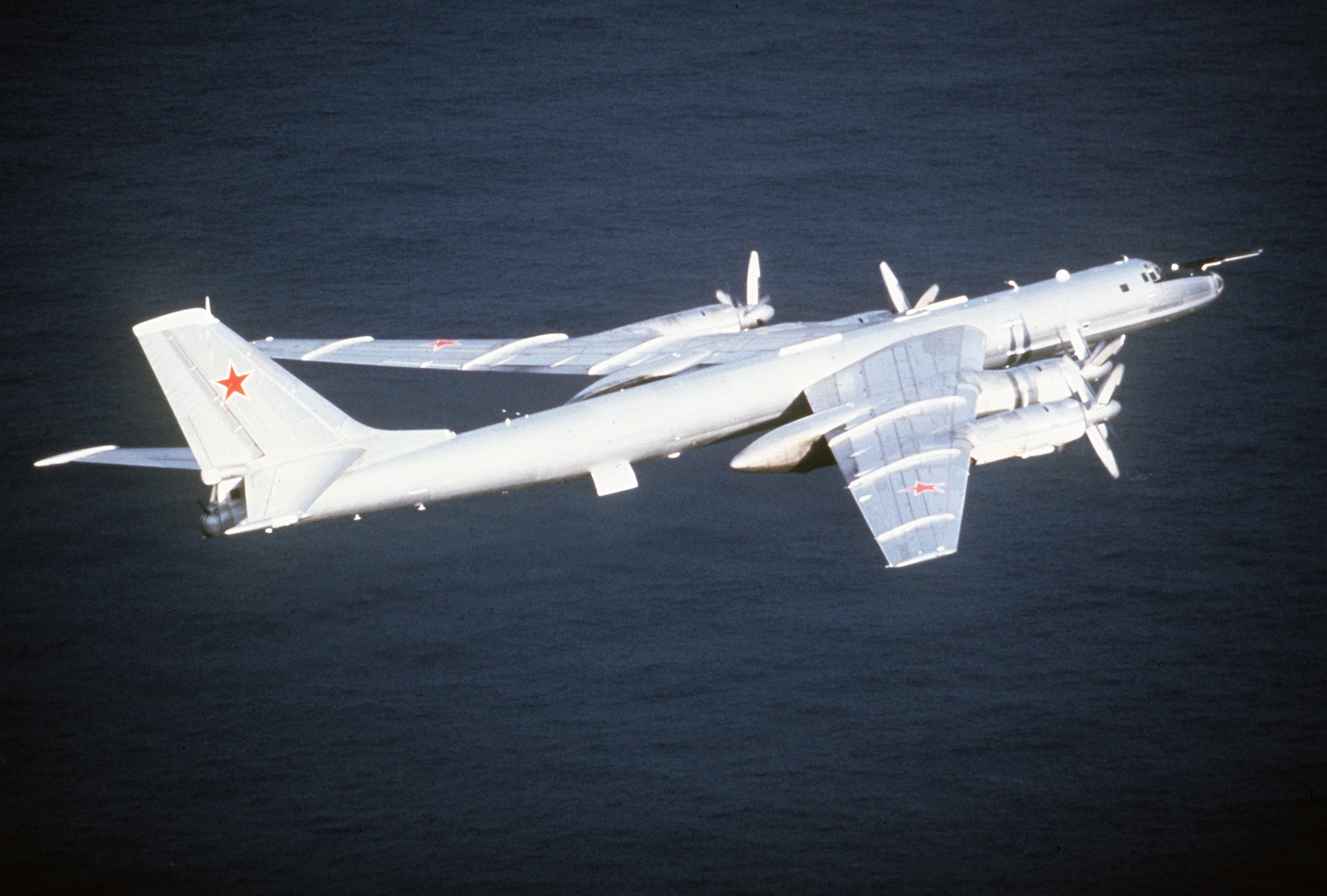
A Soviet Naval Air Force Tupolev Tu-142 maritime patrol aircraft flying over the Mediterranean Sea, 1986

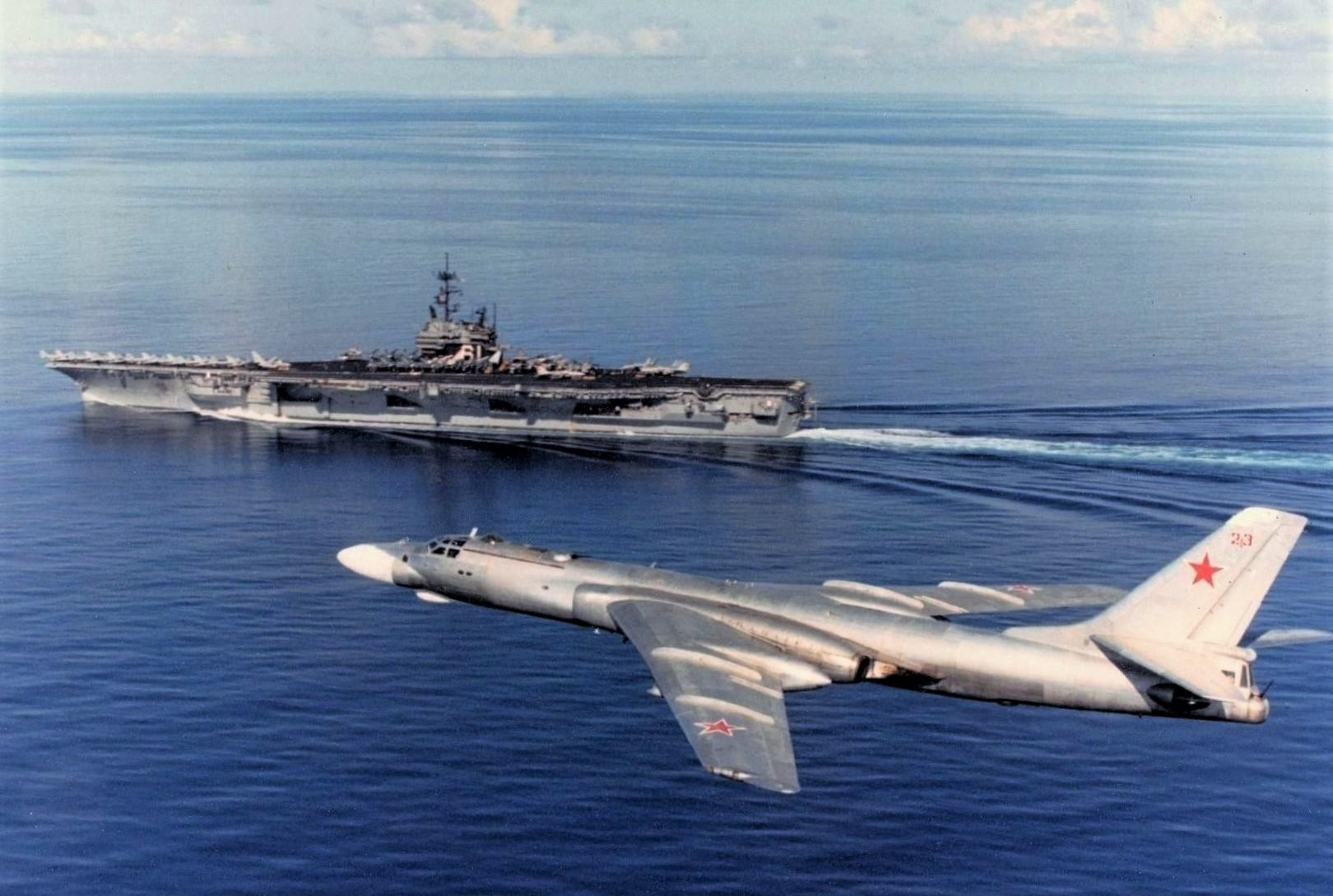
A Soviet Naval Air Force Tupolev Tu-16K-10 heavy bomber flying past USS Ranger, 1989

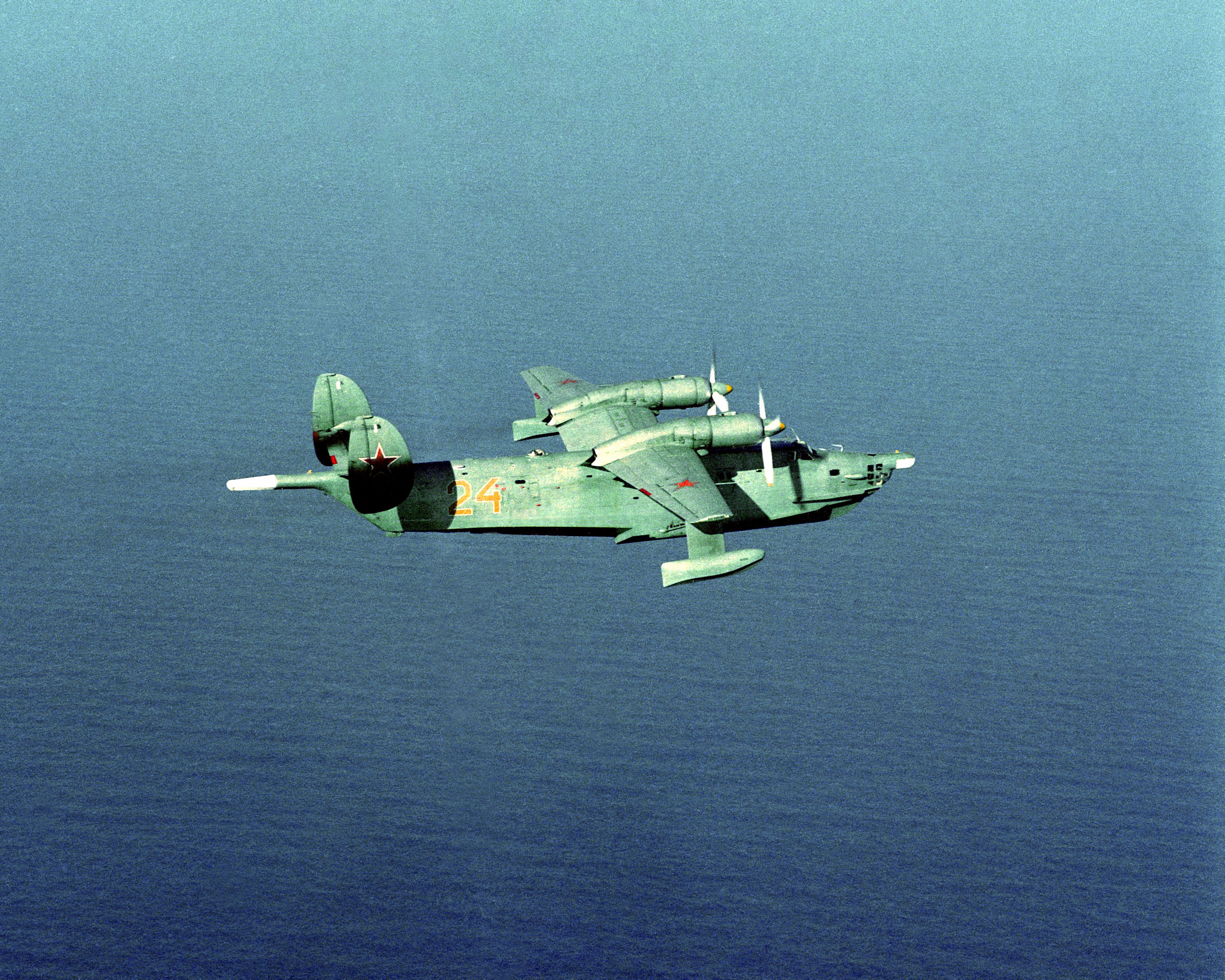
A Soviet Naval Air Force Beriev Be-12 maritime patrol amphibian is in flight, 1990

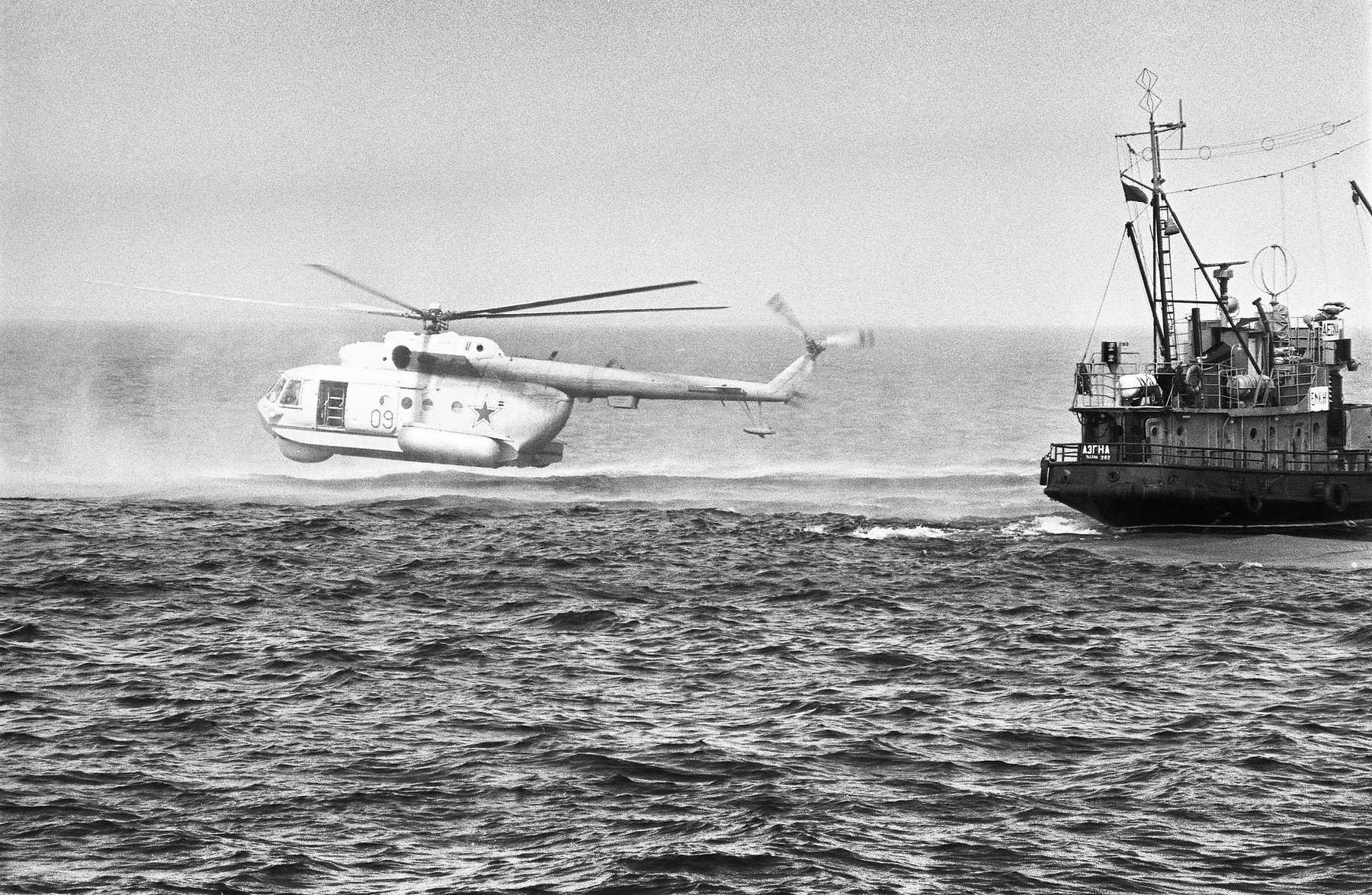
A Baltic Fleet Air Force Mil Mi-14 amphibious helicopter participating in an SAR mission, 1987

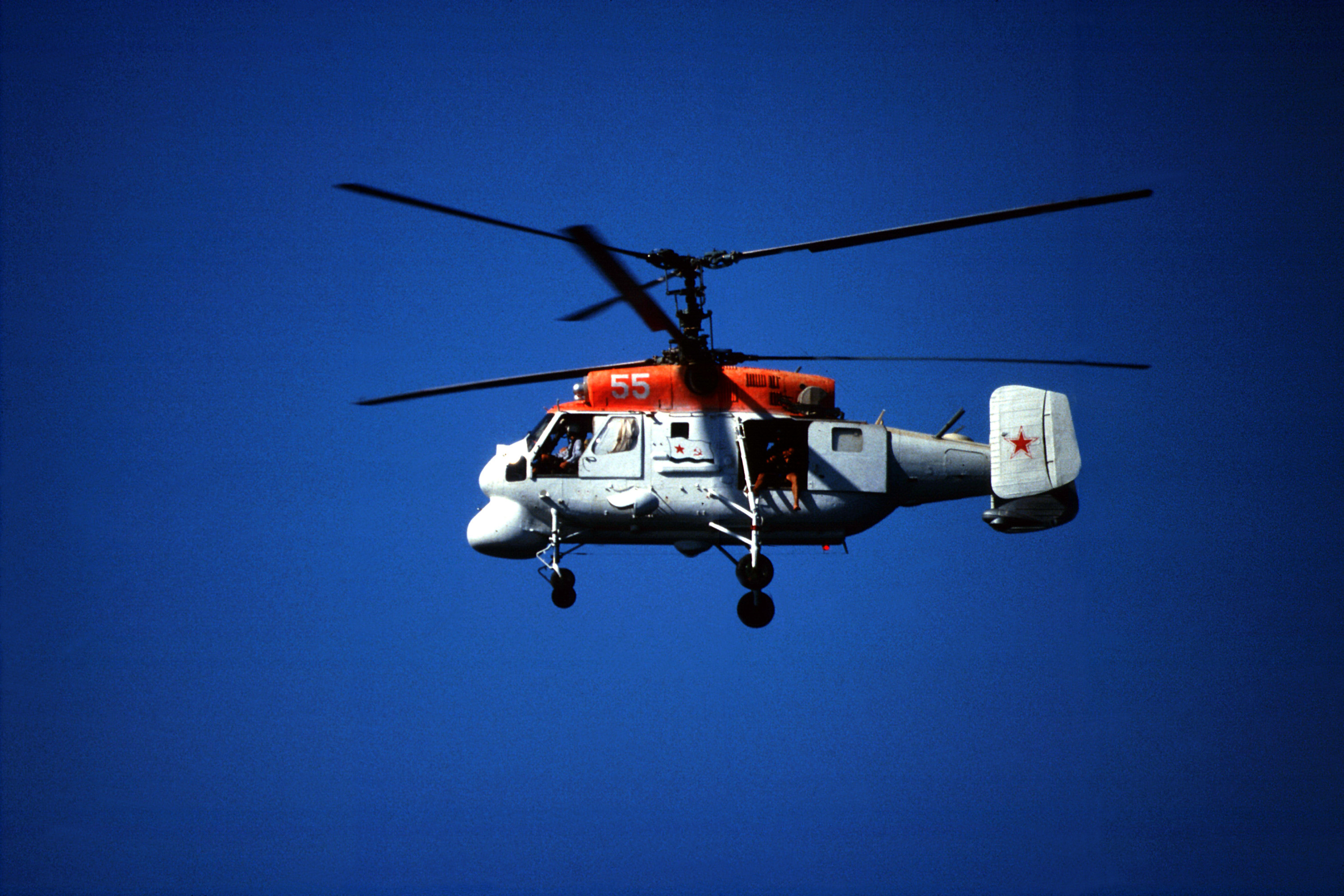
A Soviet Naval Air Force Kamov Ka-25PS SAR helicopter flying over the Gulf of Oman, 1987

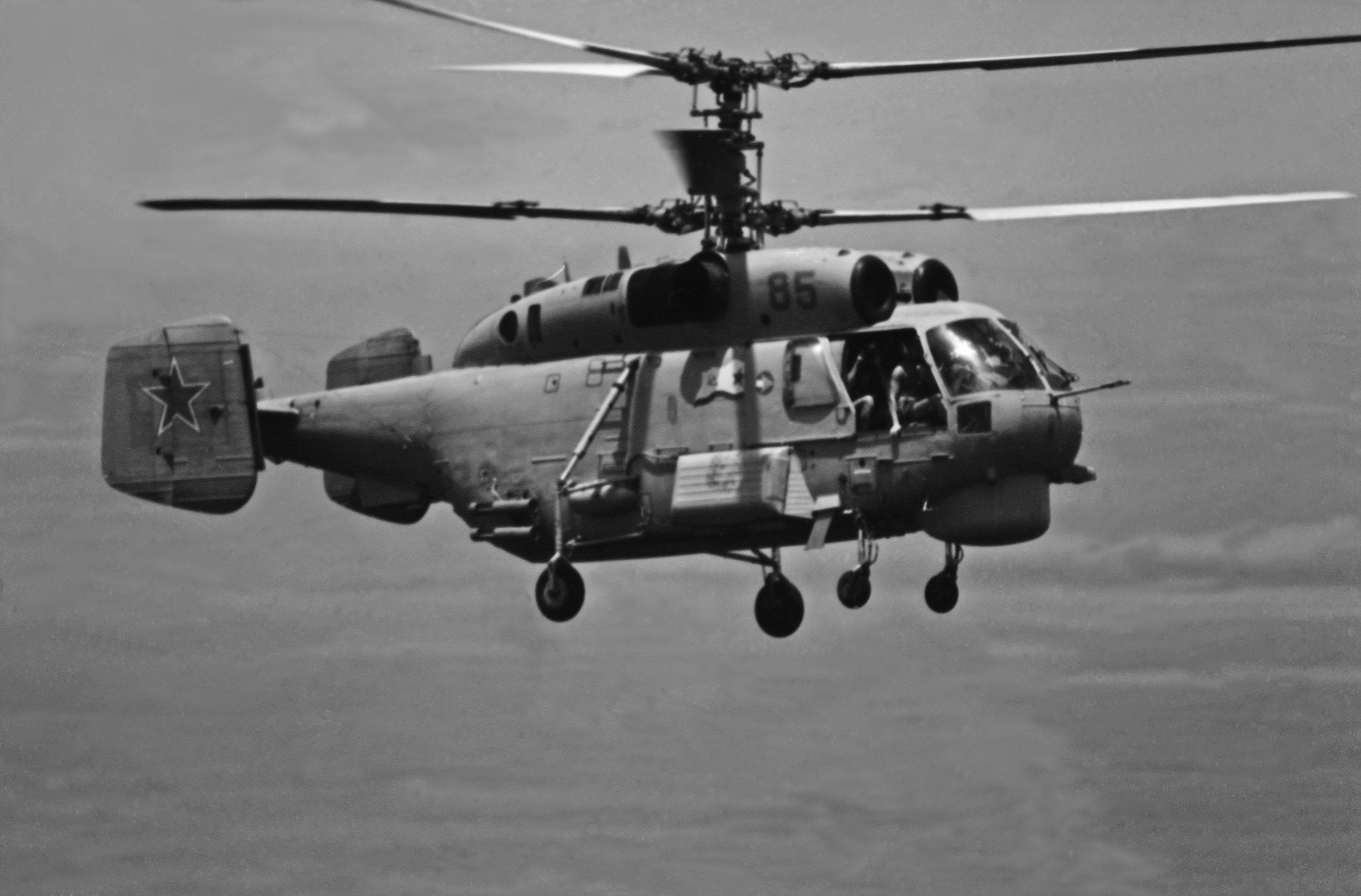
A Soviet Naval Air Force Kamov Ka-27PL ASW helicopter is in flight, c. 1988

== See also ==
- Russian Naval Aviation
