= Tupolev Tu-142 =

Soviet/Russian maritime reconnaissance and anti-submarine warfare aircraft

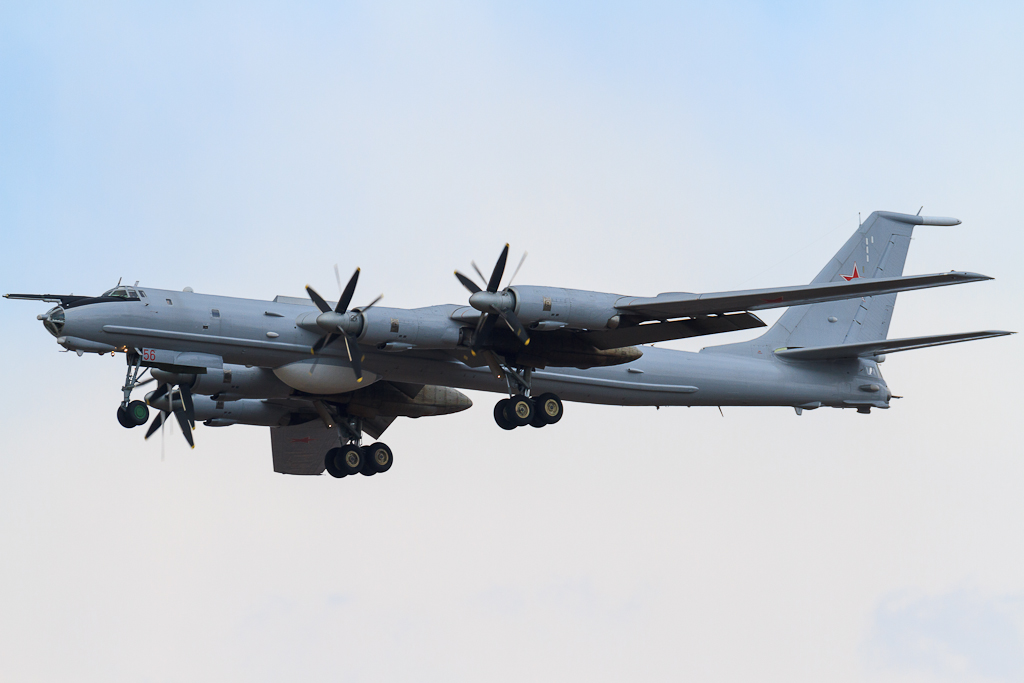
- A Tu-142 of the Russian Navy.

General information
- Type: Maritime patrol and anti-submarine warfare aircraft
- National origin: Soviet Union; Russia
- Designer: Tupolev
- Built by: Kuibyshev Aviation Plant; Taganrog Machinery Plant
- Status: Out of production, in service
- Primary users: Russian Navy Soviet Navy (historical); Indian Naval Air Arm (historical)
- Number built: 100

History
- Manufactured: 1968–1994
- Introduction date: December 1972
- First flight: 18 July 1968
- Retired: 2017 (India)
- Developed from: Tupolev Tu-95

The Tupolev Tu-142 (Russian: Туполев Ту-142; NATO reporting name: Bear F/J) is a Soviet/Russian maritime reconnaissance and anti-submarine warfare (ASW) aircraft derived from the Tu-95 turboprop strategic bomber. A specialised communications variant designated Tu-142MR was tasked with long-range communications duties with Soviet ballistic missile submarines. The Tu-142 was designed by the Tupolev design bureau, and manufactured by the Kuibyshev Aviation and Taganrog Machinery Plants from 1968 to 1994. Formerly operated by the Soviet Navy and Ukrainian Air Force, the Tu-142 currently serves with the Russian Navy.

Developed in response to the American Polaris programme, the Tu-142 grew out of the need for a viable Soviet ASW platform. It succeeded the failed Tu-95PLO project, Tupolev's first attempt at modifying the Tu-95 for maritime use. The Tu-142 differed from the Tu-95 in having a stretched fuselage to accommodate specialised equipment for its ASW and surveillance roles, a reinforced undercarriage to support rough-field capability, improved avionics and weapons, and enhancements to general performance. The Tu-142's capability was incrementally improved while the type was in service, eventually resulting in the Tu-142M3, the final long-range Tu-142 with highly sophisticated combat avionics and a large payload. Tupolev also converted a number of Tu-142s as avionics (Tu-142MP) and engine (Tu-142LL) testbeds.

== Design and development ==
=== Early designs ===
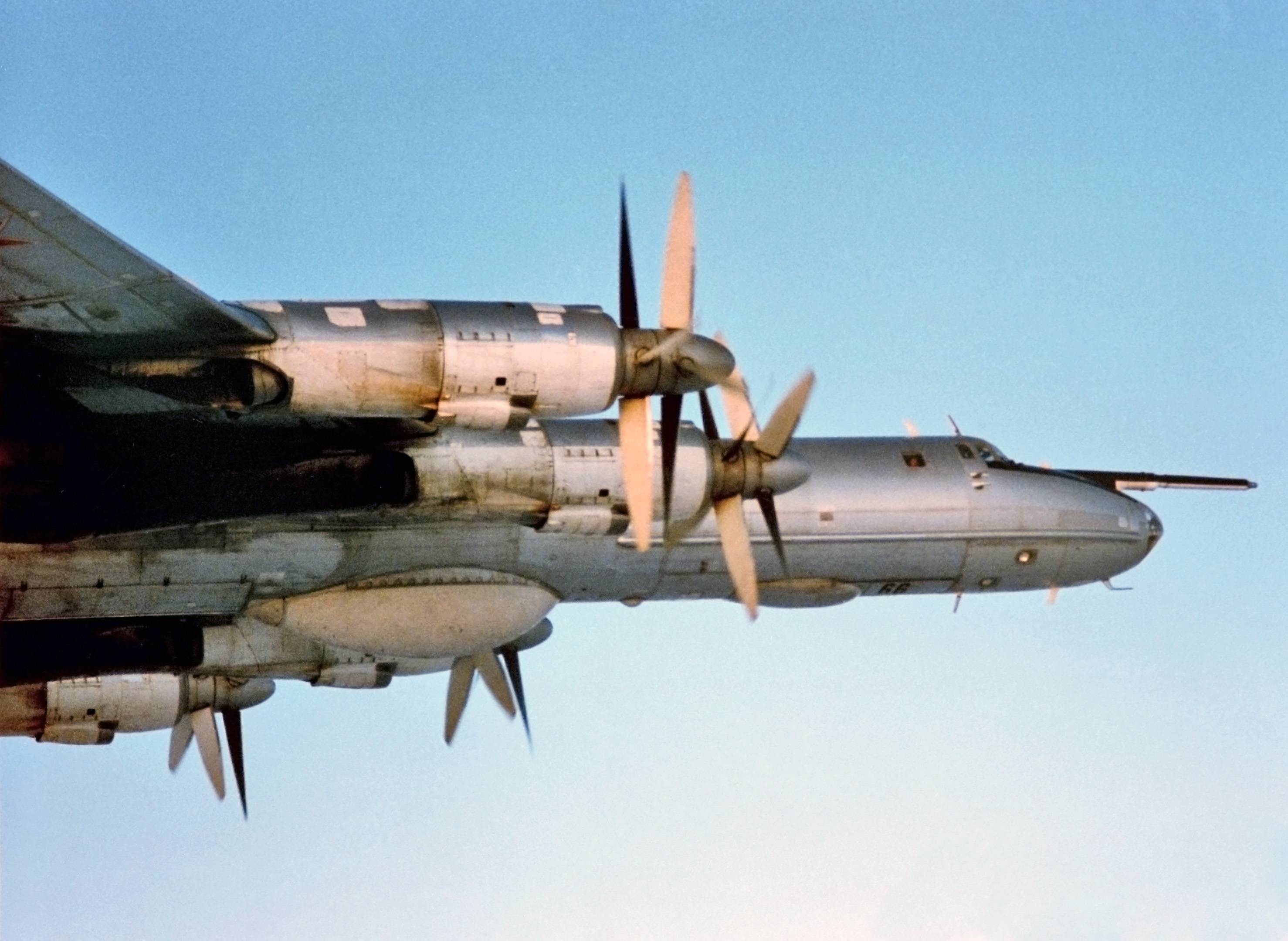
The Tu-142M is powered by four 11,033 kW (14,795 shp) Kuznetsov NK-12MV turboprops, which drive contra-rotating AV-60N propellers.

In the late 1950s the US Navy developed the UGM-27 Polaris, a submarine-launched ballistic missile (SLBM) with a range of more of than 1,800 kilometres (1,000 nm). They had test-fired rocket boosters to perfect the design, culminating in the first underwater launch of a ballistic missile by USS George Washington on 20 July 1960. Polaris became operational on 15 November that year, when the George Washington left Charleston, South Carolina, with a complement of nuclear-armed Polaris missiles.

The Soviet government consequently ordered Tupolev and other aircraft design bureaus to study possible dedicated anti-submarine warfare (ASW) designs. Tupolev initially designed the Tu-95PLO (protivolodochnaya oborona, or ASW), a development of the Tu-95 equipped with sonobuoys, anti-submarine mines and torpedoes. It was to carry a 9,000 kg (19,841 lb) payload with a maximum loiter time of 10.5 hours. The design was dropped, however, because it lacked a powerful radar, thermal imaging (infrared) system and magnetic anomaly detector (MAD). On 28 February 1963, the Council of Ministers (the highest executive and administrative body of the Soviet Union) issued a directive to Tupolev requiring his bureau to develop a long-range ASW aircraft.

The resultant design was named Tu-142 and had features in common with the Tu-95RT. The ventral and dorsal gun turrets were removed, as was the large dielectric radome housing the Uspeh radar system, which was replaced by a thermal imaging system located in a smaller fairing. This left the tail turret with twin 23-mm AM-23 cannons, along with electronic countermeasures, as the only defensive armament. The aircraft's search-and-targeting system featured Berkut (Golden Eagle) 360° radar. A complex navigation system was integrated with the weapons targeting system. Structural differences included an airfoil change to the wing, expanding its area to 295 m^{2} (3,172 ft^{2}). The area of the elevators was increased by 14%, and improved hydraulic actuators were fitted. Metal fuel tanks replaced rubber bladders. To allow the Tu-142 to operate from semi-prepared runways, the Tu-95's four-wheel main undercarriage bogies were replaced with 12-wheel units; the main undercarriage fairings were also modified.

The first Tu-142 (construction number 4200) was built at the Kuibyshev Aviation Plant in Samara. It performed its first flight on 18 June 1968, with test pilot I. K. Vedernikov at the controls, taking off from Zhukovsky Airfield southeast of Moscow. Early testing indicated that the fuselage needed to be lengthened by at least 1.5 m (4.9 ft) to accommodate new combat equipment. Therefore, the second prototype (c/n 4201) joined the flight-test programme on 3 September with a 1.7-metre (5.6 ft) front fuselage stretch, a modification found on all subsequent Tu-142s. The third and final development Tu-142 entered flight test on 31 October, complete with the full equipment suite. In May 1970, the Soviet Naval Aviation (AV-MF) – the air arm of the Soviet Navy – began receiving production Tu-142s for operational trials.

=== Variants ===
Tu-142 designations
Production	Factory	AM-VF	NATO
approx. 12 †	Tu-142	Tu-142	"Bear F"
6 †	Tu-142	Tu-142	"Bear F" Mod. 1
N/A ‡	Tu-142M	Tu-142	"Bear F" Mod. 2
approx. 43 ‡	Tu-142MK	Tu-142M	"Bear F" Mod. 3
18 ‡	Tu-142M3	Tu-142M3	"Bear F" Mod. 4
approx. 7 ‡	Tu-142MR	Tu-142MR	"Bear J"
†: Produced in Kuibyshev, ‡: Produced in Taganrog

During early operations, the Tu-142 revealed several shortcomings. The aircraft's rough-field capability was found to be of limited use, so the 12-wheel bogies used on the first 12 of 36 aircraft were replaced with four-wheel reinforced bogies from the Tu-114 airliner; consequently, the wheel-wells in the engine nacelle were made slimmer. These changes, along with the deletion of the thermal imaging system and parts of the electronic countermeasure (ECM) equipment, reduced the empty weight by 4,000 kg (8,818 lb). The modified aircraft also introduced a crew rest area for long-duration missions, and was assigned the codename ("Bear F" Mod 1); from 1968 to 1972 the Kuibyshev Plant produced a total of 18 Tu-142s.

In the early 1970s, production of Tu-142s was switched to the Taganrog Machinery Plant near the Black Sea. It has been speculated that the change to the idle plant was to give employment to the workers there. The move required many improvements to the plant and the surrounding area, including the establishment of new assembly shops, the installation of new machinery and tooling, the re-training of the workforce, and the building of a new airfield. Preparation took place until 1975, when production of the first Tu-142 began. The Tu-142s built by Taganrog incorporated the changes found on the last of the Kuibyshev aircraft. Differences included a 30-centimetre (12 in) stretch to the front fuselage and a redesigned cockpit. Additional changes included new two-axle main undercarriage bogies. This version was given the factory designation Tu-142M, which was not adopted by the Soviet Navy; NATO codenamed it "Bear-F" Mod 2.

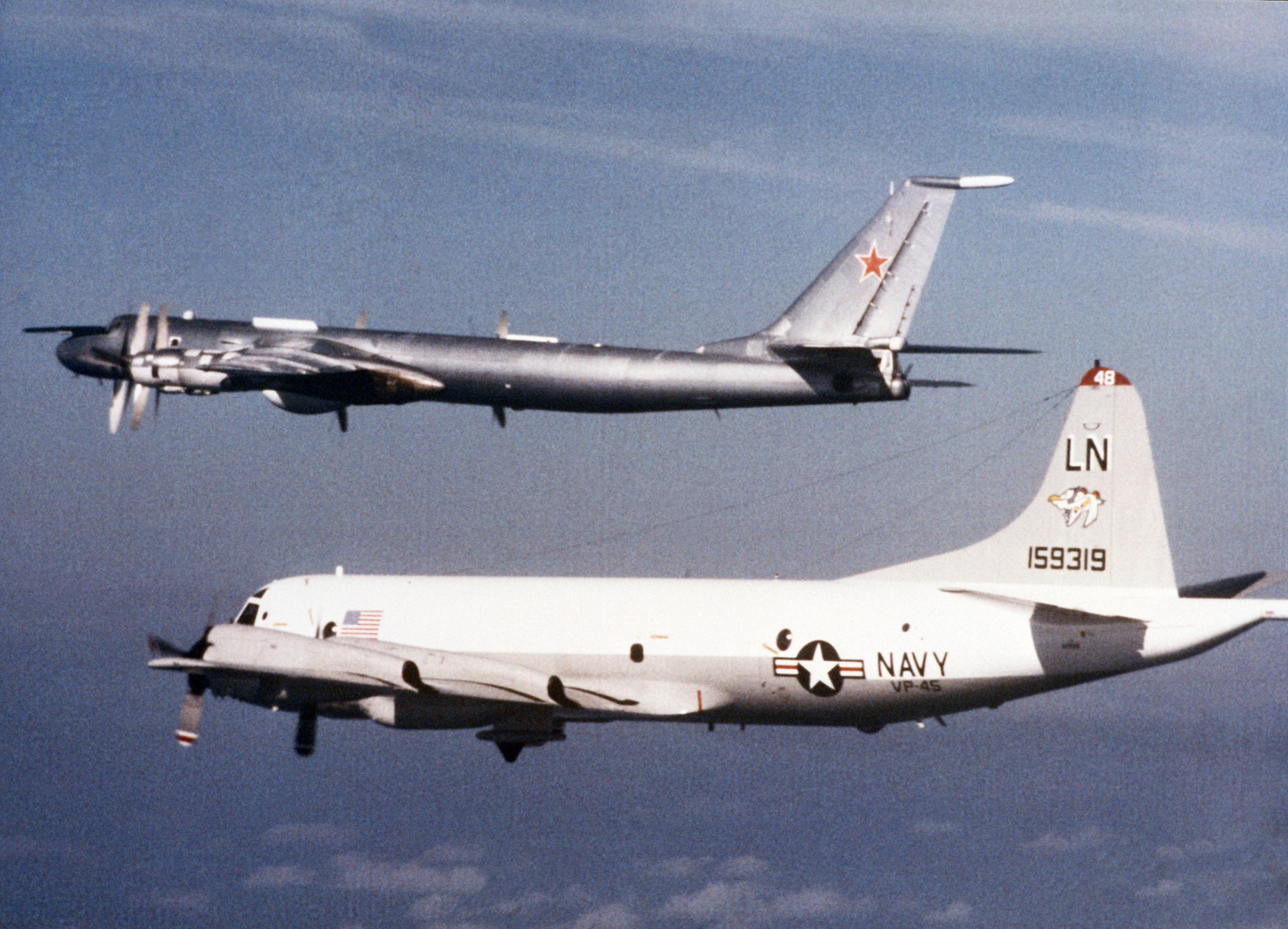
A Soviet Tu-142MK (with aft-facing fin-top fairing and smooth nose contour) being escorted by a US Navy Lockheed P-3 from VP-45 (March 1986)

As the 1970s progressed, silencing technology in submarines rendered acoustic-band sonobuoys and trigger devices ineffective. During 1961 and 1962, the Soviet Union conducted research and development into an explosive sound system (ESS) – used to locate deep-diving submarines – under the name Udar (Blow). In 1965, work had started on sonobuoy systems using ESS to be integrated with the Berkut radar. The programme was postponed when one of the aircraft intended to carry it, the Ilyushin Il-38, was found to be incompatible. The developments instead resulted in the Udar-75, which was featured in a new search and targeting system (STS) of the Taganrog-built Tu-142Ms.

A new target acquisition system dubbed Korshun-K, the cornerstone of which was the Korshun (Kite) radar, was installed on all subsequent Tu-142s. This system was used for detecting surfaced and submerged submarines, communicating with other ASW aircraft and ground bases, and performing navigational and tactical tasks. The first three Tu-142Ms were the first aircraft to be equipped with this system, and thus were redesignated Tu-142MK ("Bear F" Mod. 3). It was the first Tu-142 to feature a MAD, its MMS-106 Ladoga system being mounted in an aft-facing fairing atop the vertical stabiliser. The first of three Tu-142MKs that underwent Stage A of the trials programme made its first flight on 4 November 1975; despite the dismal performance figures, a production go-ahead was given. Stage B, conducted during April–October 1978, found that the aircraft's avionics were extremely unreliable; like Stage A, these problems were apparently ignored when a directive issued on 19 November 1980 cleared the Tu-142MK for operational service.

=== Technological upgrades ===
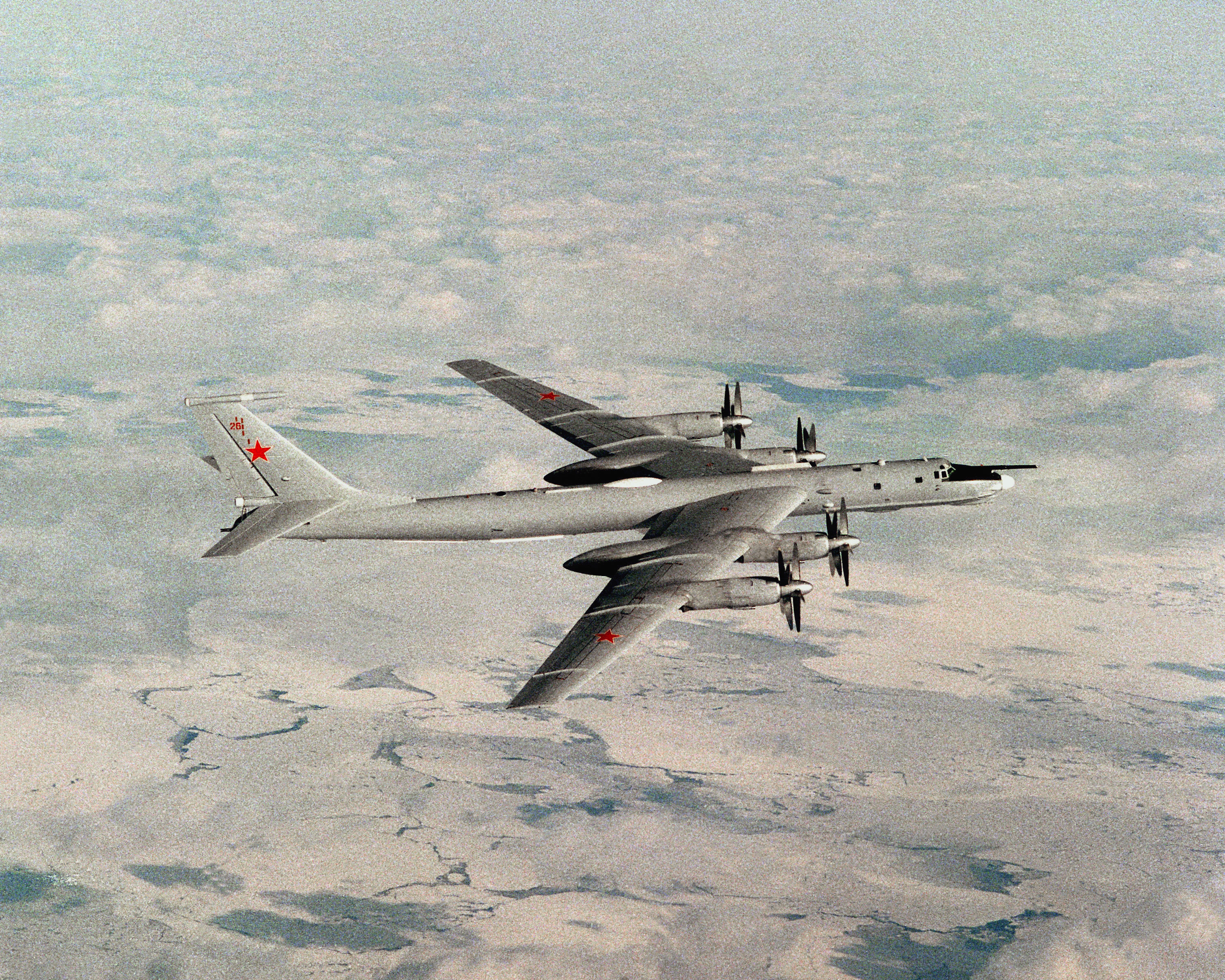
A Tu-142MR in-flight

Even as the Tu-142MK entered service, its Korshun-K STS was already becoming obsolete. Work began on yet another improved Tu-142, resulting in the Tu-142M3 ("Bear F" Mod. 4) with the Korshun-KN-N STS. This consisted of Nashatyr-Nefrit (Ammonia/Jade) ASW avionics, which included the Zarechye sonar system. As well as the RGB-1A and RGB-2 buoys of the Berkut, the Tu-142M3 was compatible with the RGB-16 and RGB-26 buoys. When working with the ASW avionics, these buoys provided 50% greater coverage. The Kuznetsov NK-12MV were replaced by the more-powerful NK-12MP engines, and for the first time, the Tu-142 had an independent engine-starting capability with the addition of the TA-12 auxiliary power unit. This variant was distinguished from earlier "Bear Fs" by the chin fairings housing several antennas.

The flight test programme started in 1985 with the maiden flight of a converted Tu-142M fitted with the advanced avionics; state acceptance trials began within two years. Test results proved excellent, as the aircraft successfully tracked nuclear-powered submarines of the Northern and Pacific Fleets. The aircraft became operational with Russian Naval Aviation (AV-MP) in 1993. The last Tu-142M3 rolled off the Taganrog production line the following year, bringing an end to a 26-year production run during which 100 Tu-142s were produced.

A communications variant designated Tu-142MR ("Bear J") was the last production version of the Tu-142. It was tasked with long-range communications duties with Soviet ballistic missile submarines, a role similar to that of the Boeing E-6 Mercury. The Tu-142MR differed from the ASW Tu-142s in having less-sophisticated avionics, but had a long trailing wire radio aerial to relay messages to submerged Soviet submarines in times of nuclear war. This was among the many distinctive features of the Tu-142MR that allows it to communicate with satellites, airborne and ground-based command posts, and submarines. The aircraft replaced the Ilyushin Il-80 in the airborne command and control role. Tu-142s are currently operated by the 76th Naval Aviation Regiment from Kipelovo. Other developments of the Tu-142 include the one-off Tu-142MRT maritime reconnaissance variant, and the unbuilt Tu-142MS missile-carrying variant. Russian maritime patrol aircraft (MPAs) Tupolev Tu-142M3/MR ('Bear F/J') of the Northern Fleet are being equipped with datalinks to enable them to receive targeting feeds from Russian Naval Aviation Israel Aerospace Industries (IAI) Forpost unmanned aerial vehicles (UAVs).

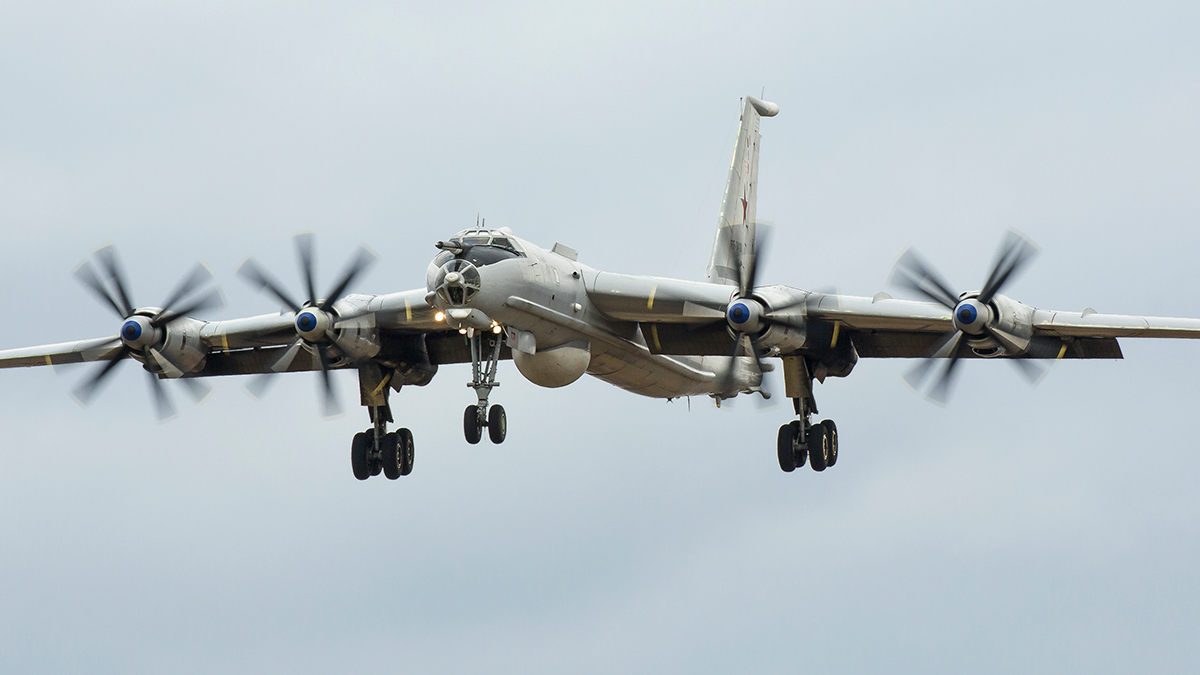
A Tu-142M3 approaching Vladivostok International Airport (2019)

== Operational history ==
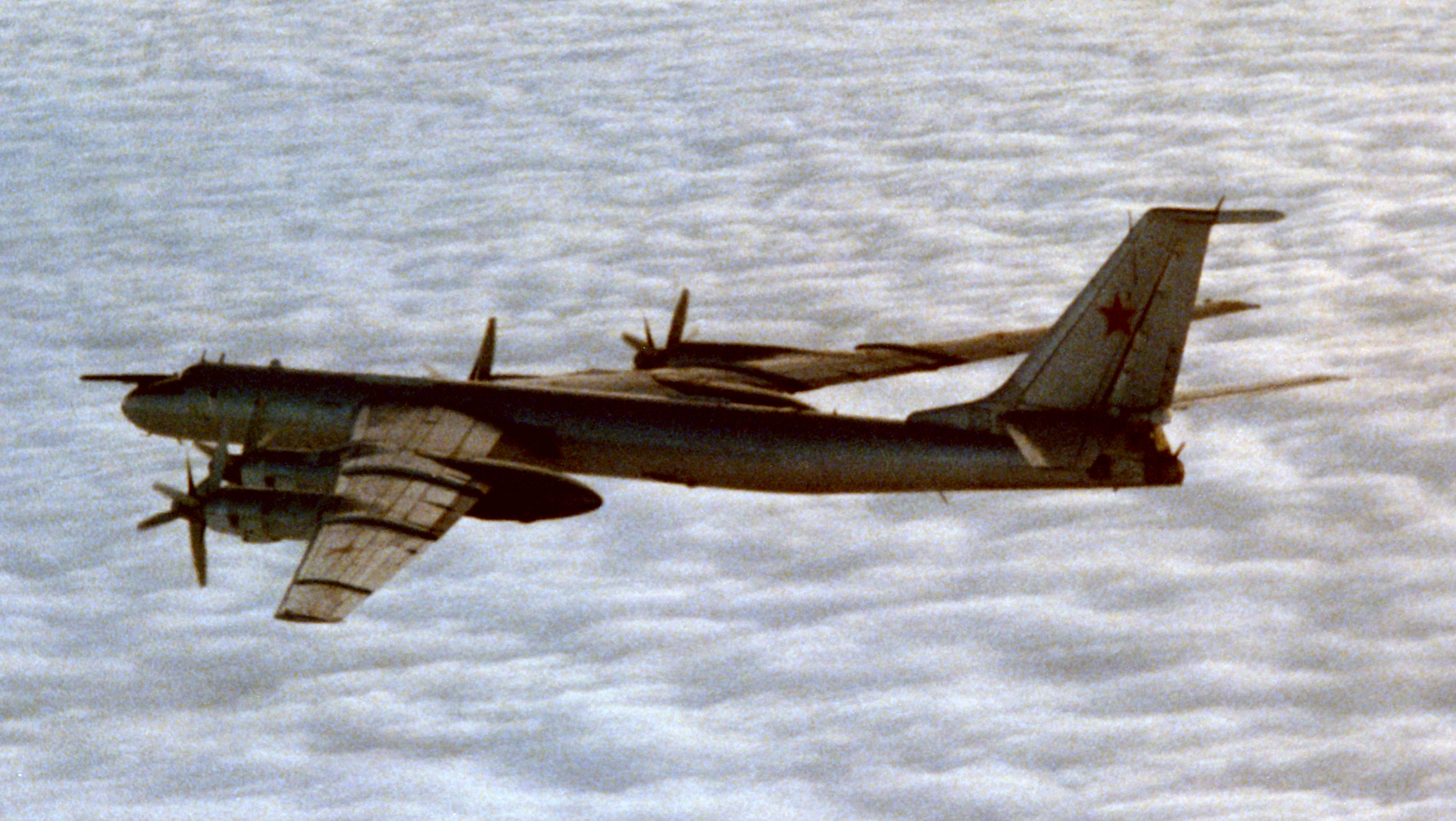
A Soviet Tu-142M flying above the clouds (1986)

To prepare for Tu-142 operations, on 22 June 1960 the Soviet Navy began selecting personnel for conversion training. The first group began its three-month training period on 4 March 1970 at the seaside town of Nikolayev (since renamed Mykolaiv). Meanwhile, the first Tu-142s were delivered to the Northern Fleet at Kipelovo AB, where they were initially tasked with tracking and monitoring nuclear-powered submarines as part of the type's operational trials. Throughout the test programme, effort focused on the verification of the ASW avionics, notably the Berkut-95 radar, as the airframe itself was not a major concern. The Tu-142 reached initial operational capability in December 1972 after a successful flight-test programme. Prior to that, in December 1971, the second group selected for Tu-142 operations started its own conversion training. Deliveries of the aircraft at first proceeded slowly; as more Tu-142s were produced, the type was allocated to the Pacific Fleet.

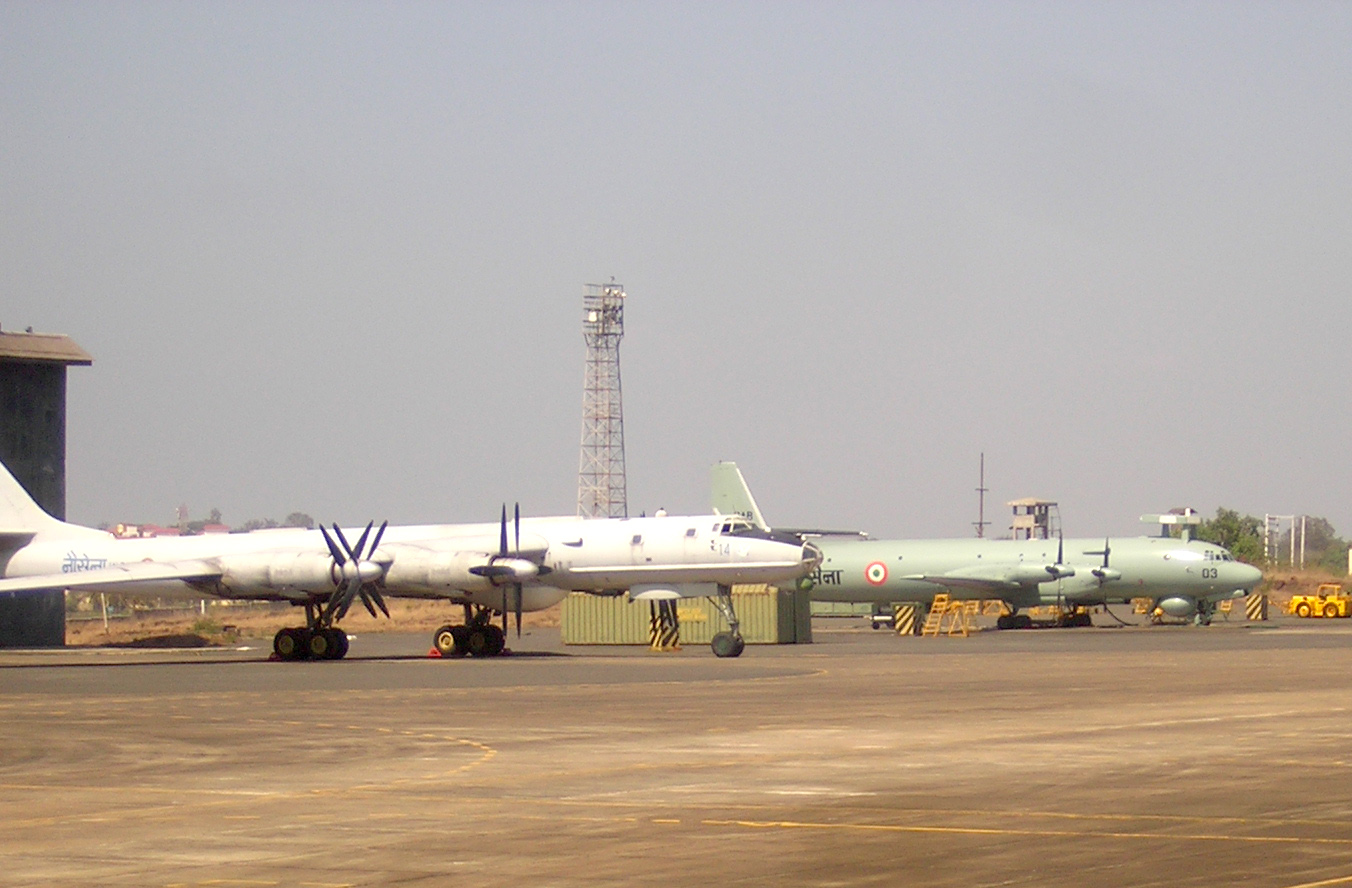
A Tu-142MK-E and an Ilyushin Il-38 "May" of the Indian Naval Air Arm seen at INS Hansa, Goa (2006)

Throughout its operational history, the Tu-142 demonstrated significant capabilities. On 19–22 August 1974, four Tu-142s shadowed a foreign submarine in the Barents Sea; one of the aircraft was reported to have maintained continuous contact for 2 hours and 55 minutes. In 1975, a Tu-142 managed to trail a Soviet submarine for 3 hours and 16 minutes. On 10 October 1977, a group of five Tu-142s tracked a US submarine in the Philippine Sea; one of the Tu-142s reportedly trailed the submarine for 4 hours and 5 minutes. Soviet Tu-142s, besides operating domestically, were sent to friendly overseas bases in Angola, Cuba, Ethiopia, Vietnam, and South Yemen. In the early 1990s, with the dissolution of the Soviet Union, the Soviet fleet of Tu-142s was handed to the Russian Navy, although the Ukrainian Air Force gained a few Tu-142s that had been left in its territory. Ukrainian Tu-142s were later dismantled as a result of the bilateral START I treaty signed between the United States and the Soviet Union in 1991, which came into effect in late 1994.

A one-off Tu-142MP was constructed as a testing platform for a new ASW suite. Another Tu-142 was converted to replace the Tu-95LL for the testing of turbojet engines. Designated Tu-142LL, the ASW equipment and armament were removed to allow an engine test bed to be carried under the belly. Some of the engines installed were the NK-25 for the Tu-22M3, RD36-51A for the Tu-144D, and the NK-32 for the Tu-160. The first Tu-142MK was converted for an airborne laboratory role, setting several altitude-in-horizontal and time-to-climb records in its class.

In 1981 the Indian Navy began considering a long-range maritime reconnaissance and anti-submarine warfare aircraft for its Naval Air Arm. The Soviet Union initially offered to refurbish some of its own Tu-142s for India, rather than construct new aircraft. The Indian Navy was at first hesitant about the large Tu-142, which was heavy and thus would require runways to be reinforced and lengthened at potential operating bases. Consequently, the service requested three Ilyushin Il-38s – then being phased out of service with the Soviet Navy – be refurbished for Indian operations. This request fell through, and so in December 1984 an agreement to purchase eight Tu-142s was signed.

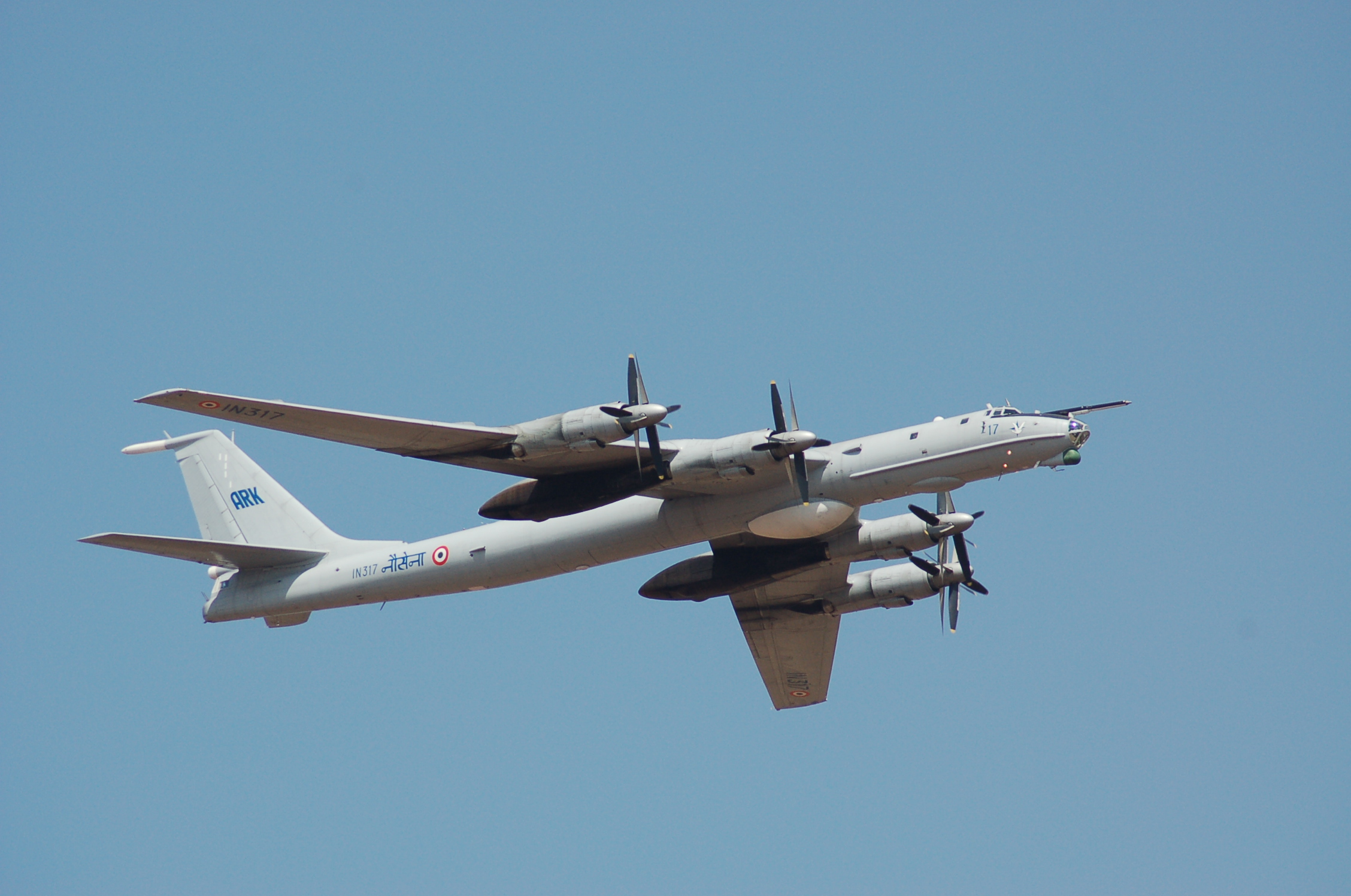
An Indian Navy Tu-142 in 2007

For the twelve-month period starting from May 1987, the Indian Navy sent 40 pilots and observers, 16 technical officers and 128 sailors to Riga for training. On 30 March 1988, the first three Tu-142s arrived at the Indian naval air station of INS Hansa, Goa, after a flight from Simferopol (Gvardeyskoye Air Base) in the Crimean peninsula. On 13 April two more aircraft arrived, prior to the commissioning of INAS 312, the operator of Indian Tu-142s; by the end of October the fleet of eight Tu-142s was delivered. Indian Naval Air Arm Il-38s, Breguet Alizes and Tu-142s were involved in the search of a hijacked cargo ship Progress Light during Operation Cactus on 4 July 1988. They helped direct gunfire from the frigates INS Godavari and INS Betwa during the engagement with Sri Lankan mercenary forces.

In May 1992, the squadron was relocated to its current operating base at INS Rajali on the Indian east coast. The Tu-142s were replaced by twelve smaller Boeing P-8Is. The Indian Navy retired the last three operational aircraft on 29 March 2017.

In 2020, two Tu-142s were intercepted by RAF Typhoons near British Airspace.

In August 2023, a Tu-142 Bear-F and Bear-J were intercepted by RAF Typhoons north of Shetland.

On 30 May 2026, the Ukrainian Unmanned Systems Forces (USF) said that it had destroyed two Russian Tu-142s in a drone strike on an airfield in Taganrog, Rostov Oblast. The USF released a video of the operation, which also reportedly destroyed an Iskander missile system. Both were possibly unflyable prior to the strike.

== Variants ==
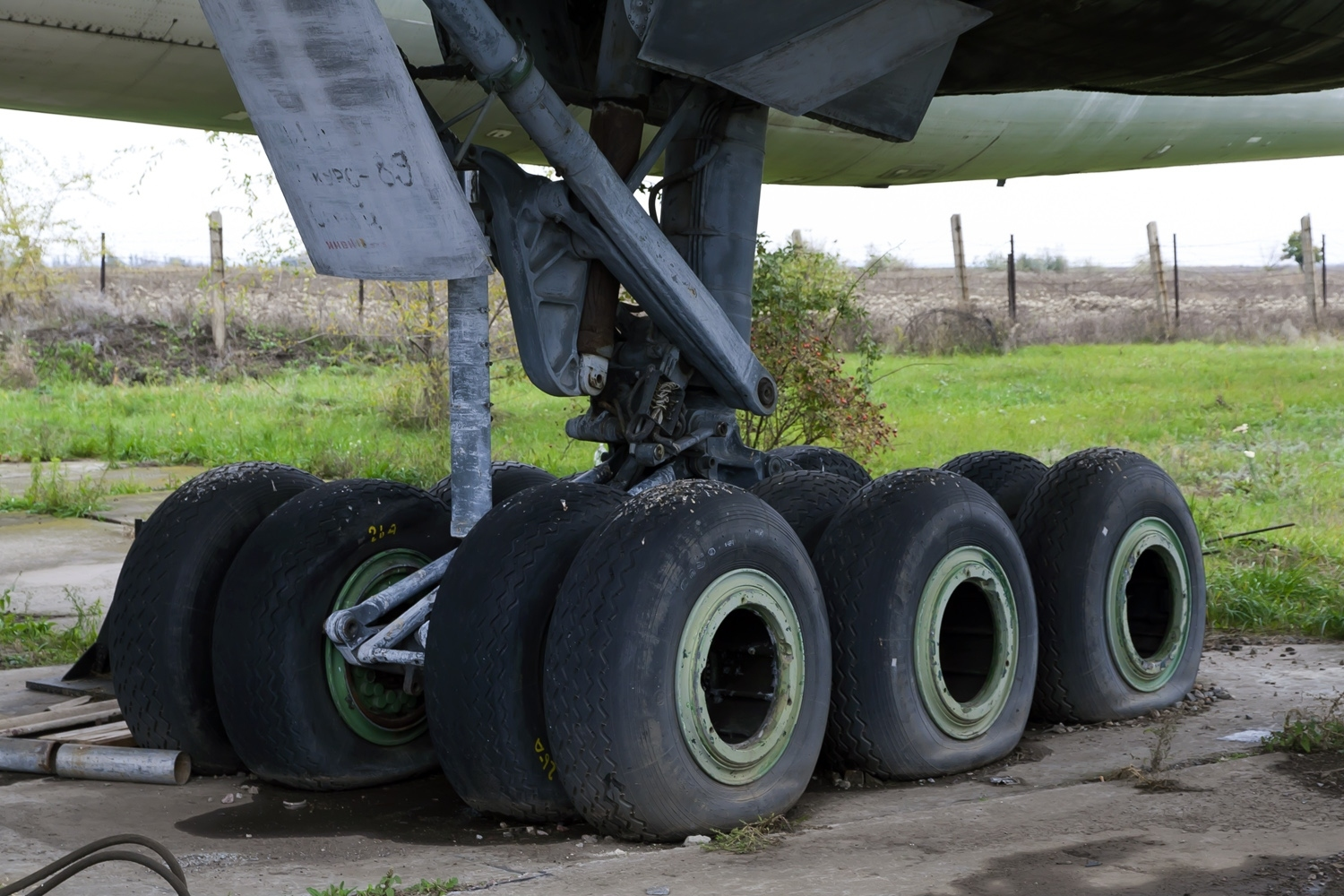
The 12-wheel undercarriage of the early Tu-142 aircraft built at the Kuibyshev Aviation Plant (2011)

Tu-142
A lengthened Tu-95 with much defensive armament removed, and instead incorporating ASW systems. Twelve aircraft initially had 12-wheel main undercarriage bogies. Six later aircraft had four-wheel bogies. Built by Kuibyshev Aviation Plant.

Tu-142M
A 30-centimetre (12 in) stretch to front fuselage, redesigned cockpit and two-axle main undercarriage bogies. Built by Taganrog.

Tu-142MK
Greatly improved variant with new Korshun radar, avionics and ASW equipment. 43 Tu-142MKs were constructed by Taganrog.

Tu-142MK-E
Eight downgraded Tu-142MKs purchased by the Indian Naval Air Arm. E stands for "export".

Tu-142M3
The last production variant of the "Bear F", with new NK-12MP engines and a new avionics suite. Can be distinguished from other Tu-142s by its chin fairings. Built by Taganrog.:

Tu-142MZ

The final operational production version of the Tu-142M3. NATO name Bear-F Mod.

Tu-142M3-K
Proposed commercial cargo variant of the Tu-142M3 (the K standing for "kommercheskiy"), with ASW avionics removed. Also designated Tu-142M3-C.

Tu-142MP
Modified single Tu-142M used as avionics testbed.

Tu-142MR
Modified Tu-142MKs built as submarine communications relay aircraft. Has distinctive external fairings and components. Aircraft modified by Beriev. NATO codename "Bear J".:

Tu-142MRM

Planned modernization of the Tu-142MR.

Tu-142LL
Two converted earlier Tu-142s used for testing of turbofan engines. ASW equipment was removed.

== Operators ==
Russia

- Russian Naval Aviation – 29 Tu-142M3/MR/MK in service. The Russian Navy plans to upgrade the Tu-142 anti-submarine aircraft with installation of the SVP-24 bombing system.
  - 7062nd Port-Arthur Krasnoznamennaya Naval Aviation Air Base – Kamenny Ruchey, Khabarovsk Krai
    - 568th Composite Aviation Regiment
  - 2nd Guards Aviation Group – Fedotovo (air base), Vologda Oblast
    - 403rd Composite Aviation Regiment

=== Former operators ===
Soviet Union

- Soviet Air Forces – aircraft were transferred to the Russian Naval Aviation after the dissolution of the Soviet Union. Some remained in the territory of Ukraine.
  - 35th Long-Range Anti-Submarine Aviation Division – Fedotovo (air base), Vologda Oblast, Russian SFSR
    - 76th Long-Range Anti-Submarine Aviation Regiment
    - 135th Long-Range Anti-Submarine Aviation Regiment
  - 310th independent Long-Range Anti-Submarine Aviation Regiment – Kamenny Ruchey, Khabarovsk Krai, Russian SFSR

Ukraine

- Mykolaiv Aircraft Repair Plant – there were no aviation regiments equipped with Tu-142s in the Ukrainian SSR, but unknown number of Tu-142s were left at the Mykolaiv Aircraft Repair Plant following the collapse of the Soviet Union. The Mykolaiv Aircraft Repair Plant was providing repairs for number types of Soviet aircraft including the Tu-142. Some aircraft later returned to their permanent bases in Russia, the remaining were dismantled in accordance with the START I agreement.
- 1 Tu-142M3 in the Ukraine State Aviation Museum.
- 1 Tu-142 in the Aviation Technical Museum (Luhansk).

India

- Indian Naval Air Arm – operated 8 former Soviet Tu-142MK-E aircraft from March 1988 to March 2017 (29 years). The aircraft were retired on 27 March 2017 during a ceremony held at the INS Rajali air base. They were replaced with the Boeing P-8I Poseidon aircraft and for bridging by the Ilyushin Il-38SD Sea Dragon.
  - INAS 312 – INS Rajali, Tamil Nadu
- 1 Tu-142M is preserved as a museum for public access opposite to the INS Kursura (S20) museum on the Beach Road, Visakhapatnam.
- 1 Tu-142MK-E is preserved as a museum for public access in the Naval Aircraft Museum, New Town, Kolkata.

== Notable accidents ==
On 7 November 2009, eleven crew were killed when their Tu-142 crashed on the Northwest Pacific coast of Russia over the Strait of Tartary between the island of Sakhalin and Khabarovsk region during a training flight. Flights of aircraft belonging to the Pacific Fleet were suspended pending an investigation into the crash. There was no indication that the crew made use of emergency equipment, although a lifeboat on board the plane was fitted with a device that transmits a signal in the event of an accident. Chief of the General Staff Nikolay Makarov believed an engine failure could have caused the crash. A memorial service was held for the crew on 16 December 2009. A search for the bodies of the eleven crew members was suspended several times due to ice floes and bad weather.

== Specifications (Tu-142M3) ==
Data from Donald and Lake

General characteristics

- Crew: 11–13
- Length: 53.08 m (174 ft 2 in)
- Wingspan: 50 m (164 ft 1 in)
- Height: 12.12 m (39 ft 9 in)
- Wing area: 311.1 m^{2} (3,349 sq ft)
- Airfoil: TsAGI SR-5S
- Empty weight: 90,000 kg (198,416 lb)
- Max takeoff weight: 185,000 kg (407,855 lb)
- Powerplant: 4 × Kuznetsov NK-12MP turboprop engines, 11,033 kW (14,795 shp) each
- Propellers: 8-bladed contra-rotating constant-speed propellers

Performance

- Maximum speed: 925 km/h (575 mph, 499 kn)
- Cruise speed: 711 km/h (442 mph, 384 kn)
- Combat range: 6,500 km (4,000 mi, 3,500 nmi)
- Service ceiling: 12,000 m (39,000 ft)
