= Semyon Zhavoronkov =

Commander of Soviet Naval Air force (1899–1967)

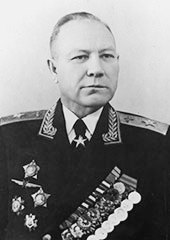
- Born: Semyon Fyodorovich Zhavoronkov; 23 April [O.S. 11 April] 1899; Sidorovskaya village, Kostroma Governorate, Russian Empire
- Died: 6 June 1967 (aged 68); Moscow, Soviet Union
- Military career
- Rank: Marshal of Aviation
- Conflicts: Battle of Lake Khasan; World War II

Semyon Fyodorovich Zhavoronkov (Russian: Семён Фёдорович Жа́воронков; 23 April [O.S. 11 April] 1899 – 6 June 1967) was an officer of the Soviet Naval Air Force.

Zhavoronkov was born in the village of Sidorovskaya, Kostroma Governorate, and from 1910 worked in a textile factory in nearby Vichuga. In 1936 he graduated from the operational department of the N. E. Zhukovsky Air Force Academy. He was appointed commander of the 101st Heavy Bomber Aviation Brigade of the Air Force of the Special Red Banner Far Eastern Army (Chita). In July 1937 he was named commander of the 5th heavy bomber air corps of the Trans-Baikal Military District. In December 1937 he was named deputy, and from the beginning of 1938, commander, of the Pacific Fleet Air Force. He participated in hostilities near Lake Khasan in the summer of 1938. In July 1939 he became Chief of the Air Force of the Navy. In this position he participated in the Soviet-Finnish war of 1939–1940.

He was Commanding General of the Soviet Naval Air Force during World War II (1939–1945). Under his leadership, aviators of the Baltic Fleet's Order of the Red Banner made a number of air strikes on military and industrial facilities in and around Berlin that began in August and September 1941. In February 1945, Zhavoronkov organized the flights of delegations to the Yalta Conference. From 1949 to 1957, he was head of Aeroflot, the Soviet national civilian airline. He retired from the military in 1959.

He lived in Moscow. He continued his scientific work at Aeroflot and worked on his memoirs, but did not manage to complete them. Several fragments of the manuscript were published in the Military Historical Journal.

He died on June 8, 1967, in Moscow. He was buried at Novodevichy Cemetery.
