= Aviation Technical Museum (Luhansk) =

Museum in Lugansk, Ukraine

- Авіаційно-технічний музей
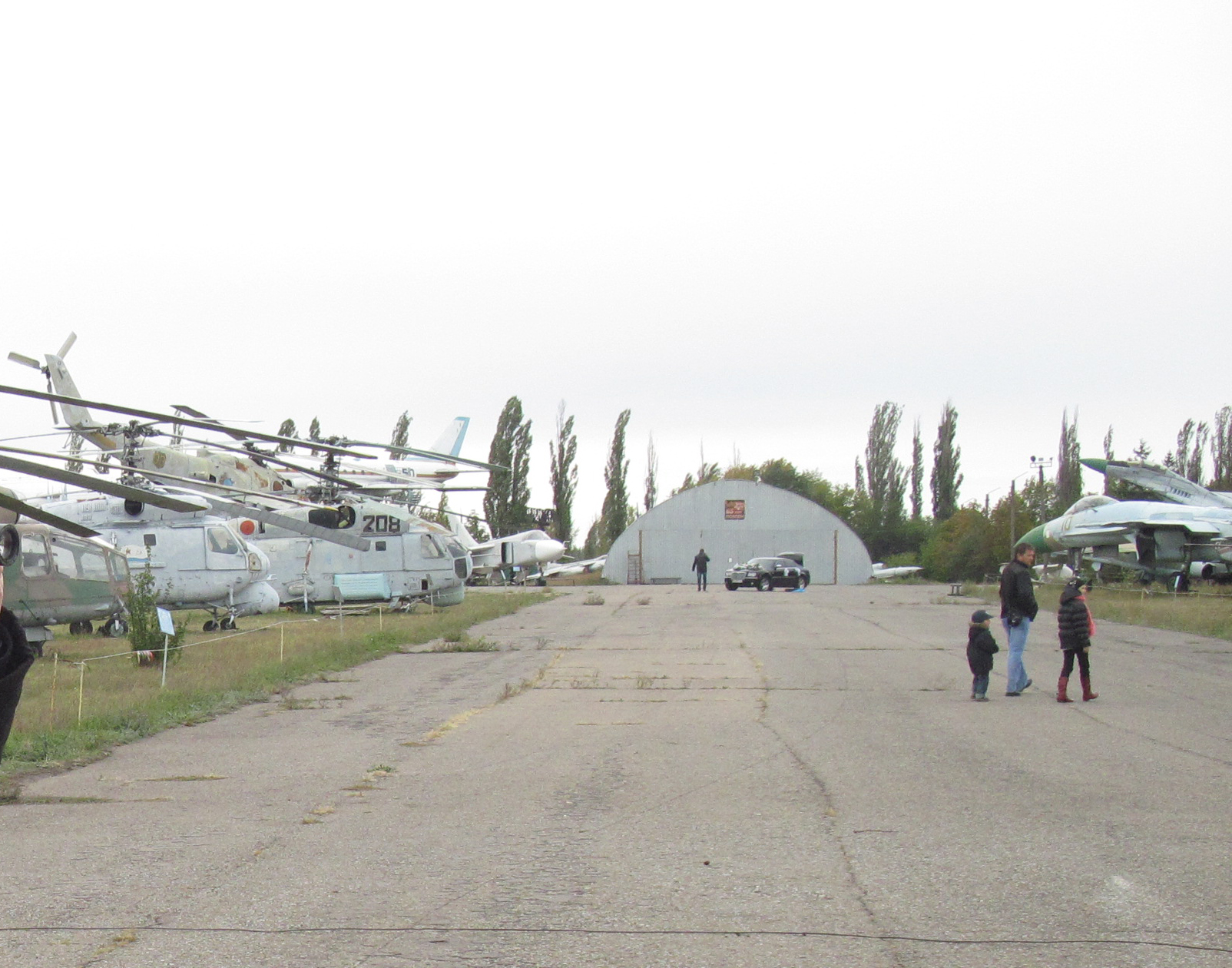
- Location: Ukraine, Luhansk, Lugansk, apt. Sharp Grave 180
- Coordinates: 48°31′40″N 39°23′0″E
- Website: avia-museum.lg.ua

The Aviation Technical Museum (Ukrainian: Авіаційно-технічний музей; Russian: Авиационно-технический музей) is a large aviation museum located in Lugansk.

Converted into a museum in 1996, the Aviation Technical Museum's first exhibits were aircraft which required maintenance and had been sent to Lugansk Aircraft Repair Plant. However, due to lack of funding, these planes and helicopters remained there, and subsequently were simply written off as scrap metal. It was then that it was decided to preserve these aircraft and they were added to the museum.

On April 12, 2011, the museum opened an exhibition dedicated to the 50th anniversary of the first crewed flight into space and the 90th anniversary of the birth of pilot-cosmonaut Georgy Berehovoy.

== Helicopters ==
Picture	Type	Description
	Ka-25PL	maritime helicopter
	Ka-26	light utility helicopter
	Ka-27	maritime helicopter
	Mi-2	light multipurpose helicopter
	Mil Mi-4	medium multipurpose helicopter
	Mil Mi-6	heavy multipurpose helicopter
	Mil Mi-8	transport helicopter
	Mil Mi-24К	helicopter gunship
	Mil Mi-24Р	helicopter gunship

== Aircraft ==
Photo	Type	Description
	Аn-14А	utility aircraft
	Аn-26Ш	military transport
	Aero L-29 Delfin	trainer aircraft
	Aero L-39 Albatros	trainer aircraft
	Be-12	amphibious aircraft
	Illyushin Il-12Т	transport aircraft
	Il-38	maritime patrol aircraft
	IL-76М	military transport aircraft
	MiG-17	fighter aircraft
	MiG-19	fighter aircraft
	MiG-21	fighter aircraft
	MiG-21УС	fighter trainer
	MiG-23М	fighter aircraft
	MiG-25	interceptor aircraft
	MiG-27	attack aircraft
	MiG-29	fighter aircraft
	MiG-29	fighter aircraft
	MiG-29	fighter aircraft
	Su-7B	fighter-bomber
	SU-17М	fighter-bomber
	Su-24	attack aircraft
	Su-25	attack aircraft
	Su-27	fighter aircraft
	Tu-124	short range airliner
	Tu-142	reconnaissance and anti-submarine warfare
	Yak-28	bomber
	Yak-38	VTOL fighter aircraft

== UAV ==
Picture	Type	Description
	Tu-141	UAV
