= Fedotovo (air base) =

Russian Naval Aviation air base

Fedotovo
- Кипелово/Федотово
- Vologodsky District, Vologda Oblast in Russia
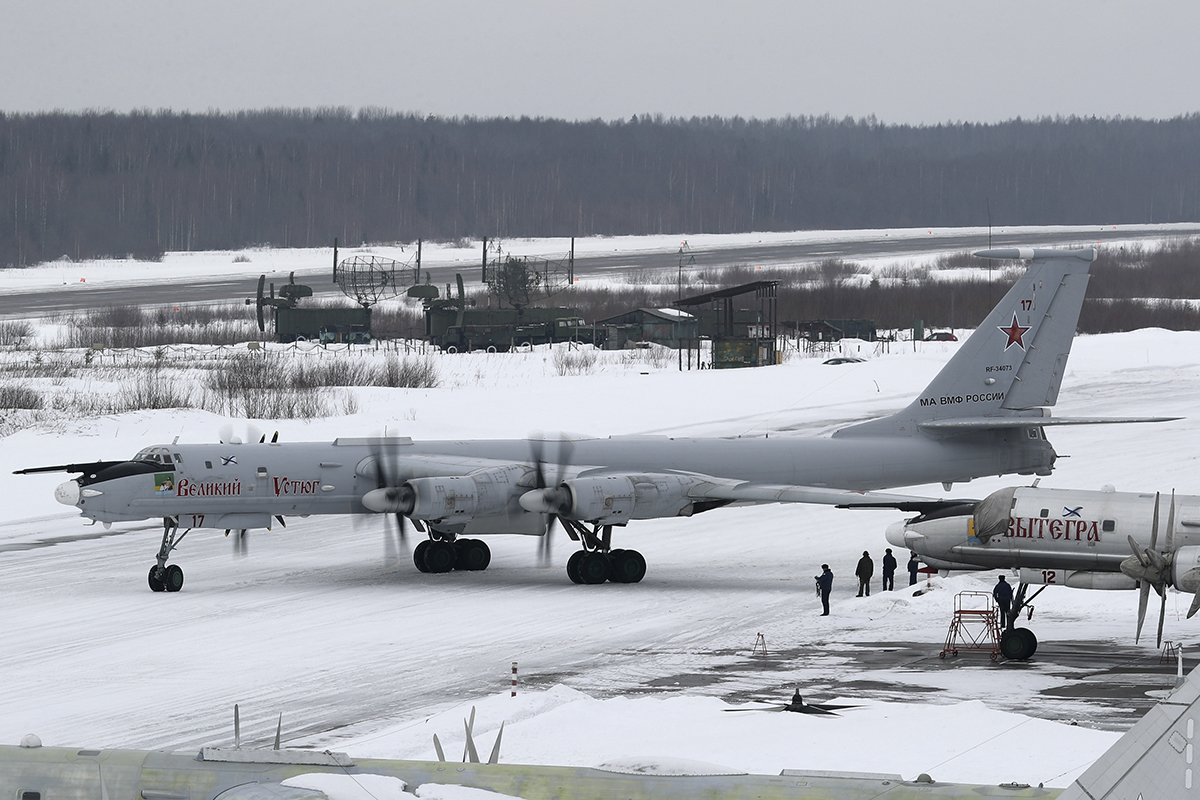

Site information
- Type: Air Base
- Owner: Ministry of Defence
- Operator: Russian Navy - Russian Naval Aviation
- Controlled by: 45th Air and Air Defence Forces Army

Location
- Shown within Vologda Oblast Fedotovo (Russia)
- Coordinates: 59°11′18″N 039°7′24″E

Site history
- Built: 1963
- In use: 1963 - present

Airfield information
- Identifiers: ICAO: XLWF
- Elevation: 175 metres (574 ft) AMSL
Runways
Direction	Length and surface
17/35	3,500 metres (11,483 ft) Concrete

Fedotovo, located near railway station Kipelovo on a major railway to St. Petersburg, is a Russian Naval Aviation air base in Russia located 44 km west of Vologda. It is a large base for long-range aircraft, with 20 revetments in a remote area and large tarmac along parallel taxiway. Built in 1963, Fedotovo was an unnamed military townlet but took on the name of the first commander of 392 ODRAP, Lt. Col. A. S. Fedotov, who was killed in an aircraft crash in 1966. Fedotovo was a major source of Tupolev Tu-95 and Tupolev Tu-142 flights overshadowing the United States Navy Atlantic Fleet. The base provided reconnaissance for the North Fleet Air Arm.

The base is home to the 2nd Guards Aviation Group, 5th Independent Anti-submarine Aviation Squadron which uses the Tupolev Tu-142MK/MR/MZ (ASCC: Bear).

Units stationed at Kipelovo include:

- 392 ODRAP (In Russian: 392 ОДРАП - Отдельный Дальне Разведывательный Авиационный Полк - Otdyel'nyy Dal'nye Razvedyvatel'nyy Aviatsionnyy Polk = 392nd Independent Long-Range Reconnaissance Aviation Regiment) flying Tupolev Tu-95RTs (Bear-D). It was Fedotovo's first unit, beginning operations in 1963 and serving active duty with the Northern Fleet Air Arm and tasked with monitoring the activities of Western navies in the Arctic, participating in space program splashdowns, and conducting search-and-rescue activities. Its aircraft were deployed regularly to Cuba throughout the 1970s and to Angola and Guinea later in the decade. A declassified CIA document written in 1977 took note of these Atlantic deployments, stating that while they had little impact on the United States, they "contribute to the threat to Western naval forces operating in the Northern Atlantic Ocean".
- 76 PLAPDD (In Russian: 76 ПЛАПДД - Противо Лодочный Авиационный Полк Дальнего Действия - Protivo Lodochnyy Aviatsionnyy Polk Dal'nyego Deystviya = 76th Long Range Anti-Submarine Aviation Regiment) flying 25 Tupolev Tu-142M (Bear-F) aircraft beginning in March 1970. Though most of its operations ane exercises tracking the United States Navy fleet took place in the Atlantic Ocean and Barents Sea, in 1976 and 1977 part of the unit participated in exercises with the Soviet Pacific Fleet and was based temporarily at its sister base Khorol. In 1992 its personnel were deployed to India to train Indian pilots on their new Tu-142MK-E aircraft.
- 135 PLAPDD (135th Long Range Anti-Submarine Aviation Regiment flying Tupolev Tu-142M and Tupolev Tu-142MR

35 PLAD (In Russian: 35 Противо Лодочная Авиационная Дивизия - Protivo Lodochnaya Aviatsionnaya Divisiya = 35th Long-Range Anti-Submarine Aviation Division) - this division grouped both regiments equipped with Tupolev Tu-142M (Bear-F) aircraft (76th and 135th PLAP DD) stationed there.
