= Anthony Rook =

British flying ace of WWII

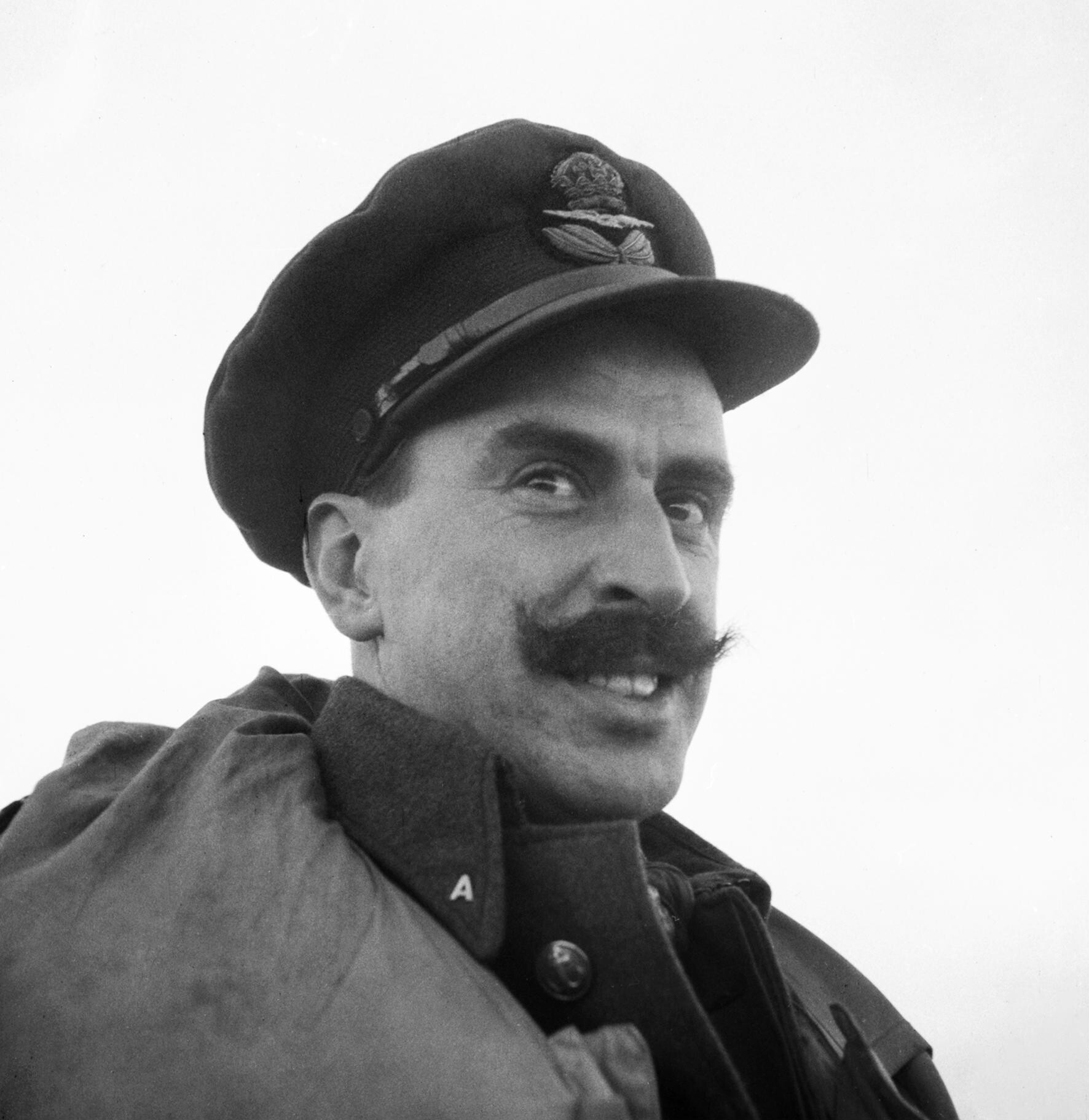
- Rook, September 1941
- Born: 4 September 1912; Nottingham, England
- Died: 8 August 1976 (aged 63); Evesham, England
- Military career
- Allegiance: United Kingdom
- Branch: Royal Air Force
- Service years: 1939–1948
- Rank: Wing Commander
- Commands: No. 81 Squadron (1941–1942); No. 504 Squadron (1946–1948)
- Conflicts: Second World War: Battle of France; Battle of Britain; Operation Benedict
- Awards: Distinguished Flying Cross; Air Force Cross; Mention in dispatches; Order of Lenin (Soviet Union)

Anthony Rook, DFC, AFC (4 September 1912 – 8 August 1976) was a British fighter pilot of the Royal Air Force (RAF) during the Second World War. He is credited with the destruction of at least three aircraft and was one of only four RAF personnel to have received the Soviet award of the Order of Lenin.

From Nottingham, Rook was a member of the Auxiliary Air Force (AAF) just prior to the outbreak of the Second World War, he was called up for service in the RAF. He flew with No. 504 Squadron during the Battle of France and then in the later stages of the Battle of Britain. In July 1941 he was given command of No. 81 Squadron, leading it to Vaenga airfield near Murmansk in Russia as part of Operation Benedict. Returning to the United Kingdom in November, he was recognised for his services in Russia with awards of the Distinguished Flying Cross and the Order of Lenin. Much of the remainder of his war service was spent on instructing duties. Released from the RAF after the war, he rejoined the AAF in 1946 as commander of No. 504 Squadron. Leaving the AAF in 1958, he died in 1976 at the age of 63.

== Early life ==
Anthony Hartwell Rook was born on 4 September 1912 in Nottingham, England. He went to Brighton College and once his schooling was complete, he worked for a merchant company. Rook joined the Auxiliary Air Force in June 1937 and commissioned as a pilot officer, served with 504 Squadron. This was a light bomber squadron based at Hucknall and equipped with Hawker Hinds. In October 1938, it became a fighter squadron and began to convert to the Gloster Gauntlet fighter. Soon afterwards Rook was promoted to the rank of flying officer.

== Second World War ==
Just before the outbreak of the Second World War in September 1939, Rook was called up for service with the Royal Air Force (RAF). No. 504 Squadron, now equipped with Hawker Hurricane fighters, was put on a war footing and commenced a period of intensive training at Digby. It then became operational with a move to Debden from where it carried out convoy patrols. After the invasion of France on 10 May, the squadron was sent there to reinforce the RAF Advanced Air Striking Force. It was fought in the aerial campaign in France and was withdrawn to England on 22 May. It refitted at Wick and subsequently moved to Castletown where it was tasked with the aerial defence of the Royal Navy base at Scapa Flow.

=== Battle of Britain ===
At the start of September No. 504 Squadron moved to Hendon to assist in the defence of London as the Luftwaffe increased its bombing campaign against the southeast of England. By this time Rook was a flight lieutenant and commander of one of the squadron'sflights. Later in the month the squadron moved to Filton near Bristol. The day after its arrival at Filton, on 27 September, it was scrambled to defend against a bombing raid against Bristol. Rook shot down one Messerschmitt Bf 110 heavy fighter and damaged a second. Three days later he damaged a Heinkel He 111 medium bomber.

The pace of operations slowed as winter approached and much of No. 504 Squadron's duties over this period and into early 1941 involved routine patrolling. On 3 April Rook shared in the destruction of a He 111. The squadron began to receive Hurricane Mk IIBs in July and at this time Rook's 'A' flight was sent to Debden where it formed the basis of No. 81 Squadron. Rook, promoted to acting squadron leader, was its commander.

=== Russia ===
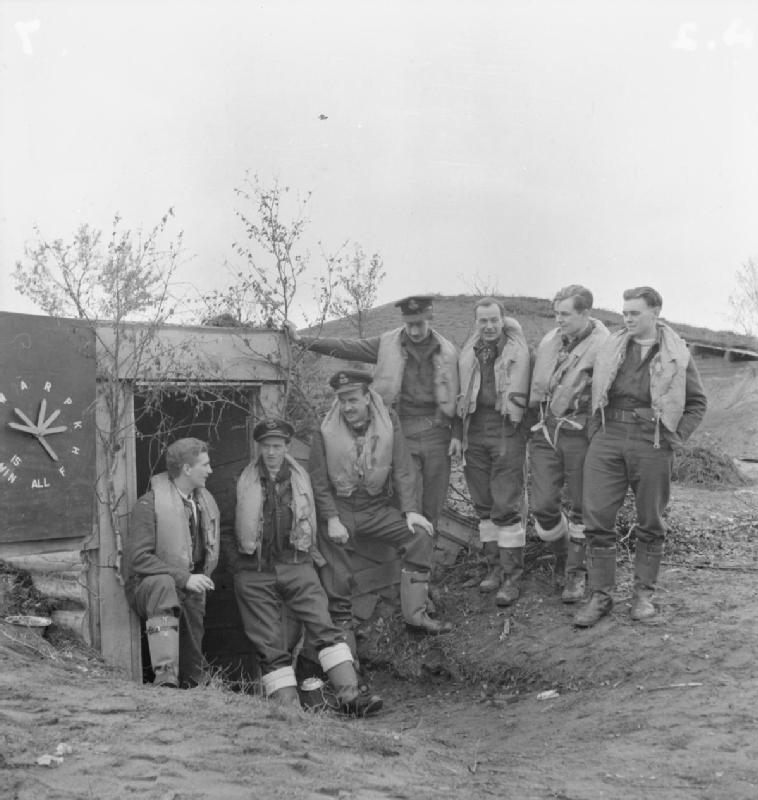
Pilots of No. 81 Squadron outside their dispersal hut at Vaenga; Rook stands third left

In August the British War Cabinet agreed to supply 200 Hurricanes to the Soviet Union. Recognising that Soviet Air Forces personnel would need training in the maintenance and flying of the Hurricanes, it was decided to send a British expeditionary force with 40 Hurricanes to Russia in Operation Benedict. No. 134 Squadron, along with Rook's No. 81 Squadron, were selected and these formed No. 151 Wing. The flying personnel of No. 81 Squadron departed the United Kingdom on 12 August aboard the aircraft carrier HMS Argus and flew their Hurricanes to Vaenga airfield, where the wing was to be based, on 1 September.

At Vaenga the wing, in addition to its training function, assisted in the aerial defence of the nearby port of Murmansk which was frequently attacked by Luftwaffe bombers. It became operational within days of its arrival of Vaenga. Rook shared in the destruction of a He 111 on 17 September. He is believed to have shared in the probable destruction of two Junkers Ju 88 medium bombers on 27 September. The operations of No. 151 Wing diminished as winter approached and by mid-November all of the surviving Hurricanes had been handed over to the Soviet Air Forces. Prior to this, pilots of No. 81 Squadron had been responsible for shooting down at least 13 German aircraft. After a period of indecision regarding the deployment of the RAF personnel, they were repatriated to the United Kingdom in late November.

Once back in the United Kingdom, No. 81 Squadron began to convert to Supermarine Spitfire fighters at Turnhouse. Rook, who had been promoted to temporary squadron leader, relinquished command of the squadron in January 1942. On 3 March, Rook was awarded the Distinguished Flying Cross in recognition of his "gallantry and devotion to duty in the execution of air operations". Later that month he was also one of four RAF personnel of 151 Wing to be awarded the Order of Lenin from the Soviet government, these being presented by the Soviet ambassador to the United Kingdom, Ivan Maisky. The four men were the only Allied recipients of the Order of Lenin during the Second World War.

=== Later war service ===
Rook's later war service involved instructing duties at No. 57 Operational Training Unit (OTU). His substantive rank was made up to squadron leader in August 1942. In the 1944 Birthday Honours, in recognition of his services with 57 OTU, he was awarded the Air Force Cross. By this time he held the rank of acting wing commander. He was mentioned in dispatches on 14 June 1945. Rook left the RAF later that year.

== Later life ==
On 1 August 1946, Rook was granted a commission in the AAF as a squadron leader and given command of 504 Squadron. Formed at Syerston, initially it was a light bomber squadron but converted to night fighters with its de Havilland Mosquito heavy fighters. It later moved to Hucknall where it changed to day fighters, equipped with Spitfires. In 1948, Rook relinquished command of the squadron and went on to the reserve for four years. His placement in the reserve was extended in July 1953 for a further five years.

In his later years Rook lived in Evesham, where he died on 8 August 1976. His death was as a result of complications that followed the administration of an anti-tetanus vaccine.
