= Charlton Haw =

British fighter pilot of WWII

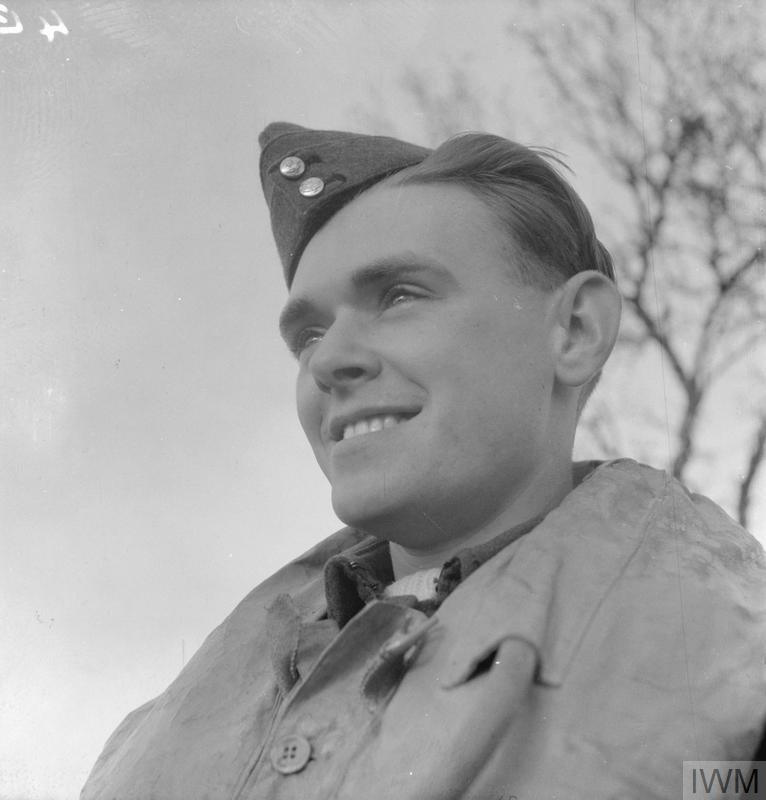
- Charlton, November 1941
- Born: 8 May 1920; York, England
- Died: November 1993 (aged 73)
- Military career
- Allegiance: United Kingdom
- Branch: Royal Air Force
- Service years: 1939–1951
- Rank: Squadron Leader
- Nickname: 'Wag'
- Units: No. 504 Squadron; No. 81 Squadron
- Commands: No. 611 Squadron; No. 129 Squadron; No. 65 Squadron
- Conflicts: Second World War: Battle of Britain; Circus offensive; Dieppe Raid; Normandy landings; Operation Diver
- Awards: Distinguished Flying Cross; Distinguished Flying Medal; Order of Lenin (Soviet Union)

Charlton Haw, DFC, DFM (8 May 1920 – November 1993) was a British fighter pilot of the Royal Air Force (RAF) during the Second World War. He is credited with the destruction of at least four aircraft and was one of only four RAF personnel to have received the Soviet award of the Order of Lenin.

From York, Haw joined the RAF's Volunteer Reserve in early 1939 and was called up on the outbreak of the Second World War. After completing his flying training, he was posted to No. 504 Squadron in June 1940 as a sergeant pilot. His first aerial victory was achieved during the Battle of Britain. In July 1941 his flight became of the basis of No. 81 Squadron and was sent to Soviet Russia with Hawker Hurricane fighters. Flying from Vaenga airfield, near Murmansk, he claimed more aerial victories. Towards the end of the year, the focus of the squadron was training Soviet pilots on the Hurricane and in November the RAF personnel returned to the United Kingdom. Haw was recognised for his services in Russia with the Distinguished Flying Medal and he was also awarded the Order of Lenin by the Soviets. Haw was commissioned in March 1942 and subsequently served with No. 122 Squadron. He was given command of his own squadron in February the following year for a brief period. After a course at Fighter Leaders School he returned to duty as commander of No. 129 Squadron, leading the unit through the Normandy landings.

Haw remained in the RAF in the postwar period, commanding No. 65 Squadron for a time, but left in 1951 after his vision deteriorated. He retired in 1985 after several years of running and owning businesses. He died in November 1993, aged 73.

== Early life ==
Charlton Haw was born in York, England, on 8 May 1920. Educated locally in York up until the age of 14, he went on to attend Leeds College of Technology. He was working as an apprentice lithographer when he joined the Royal Air Force Volunteer Reserve (RAFVR) in February 1939. He had aspired to fly since his childhood but an application to join the RAFVR the previous year had been unsuccessful after he failed the requisite medical tests. In addition to his service training, carried out at No. 4 Elementary and Reserve Flying Training School at Brough Aerodrome, he self-funded personal flying lessons and was granted his Aero Certificate by York and Leeming Flying Club in July. In September he was called up for service in the Royal Air Force (RAF) following the outbreak of the Second World War.

== Second World War ==
After a period of time at the Initial Training Wing at St Leonards-on-Sea learning military drills and practices, Haw proceeded to No. 5 Flying Training School at Sealands in mid-December. Rated an above-average pilot, his flying course was completed in June 1940, and he was subsequently posted to No. 504 Squadron. By this time, he was nicknamed 'Wag'. Haw's unit was a squadron of the Auxiliary Air Force; equipped with Hawker Hurricane fighters it was based at Wick refitting after being heavily engaged in the aerial fighting during the Battle of France. It subsequently moved to Castletown where it was tasked with the aerial defence of the Royal Navy base at Scapa Flow. There were scrambles to intercept Luftwaffe aircraft, and on one occasion Haw engaged a Heinkel He 111 medium bomber but without observable success. His own Hurricane received a bullet through the cockpit from one of the He 111's gunners. Otherwise there was generally little success for the squadron.

=== Battle of Britain ===
In early September, No. 504 Squadron moved south as a reinforcement for No. 11 Group. Based at Hendon, it was quickly and heavily engaged in the aerial fighting over London as the Luftwaffe escalated its operations over the southeast of England. Later in the month the squadron moved to Filton near Bristol. The day after its arrival at Filton, on 27 September, it was scrambled to defend against a bombing raid targeting Bristol. During this sortie, Haw engaged and destroyed a Messerschmitt Bf 110 heavy fighter over the English Channel; however, he himself was shot down and, uninjured, took to his parachute. He landed at Kilmington.

The pace of operations slowed as winter approached and much of No. 504 Squadron's duties over this period and into early 1941 involved routine patrolling. On one patrol carried out on 17 January, he and another pilot engaged and damaged what was claimed as a He 111; this was actually a Junkers Ju 88 medium bomber. The squadron began to receive updated Hurricane Mk IIBs in July. At this time Haw's 'A' flight was sent to Debden where it formed the basis of No. 81 Squadron.

=== Russia ===
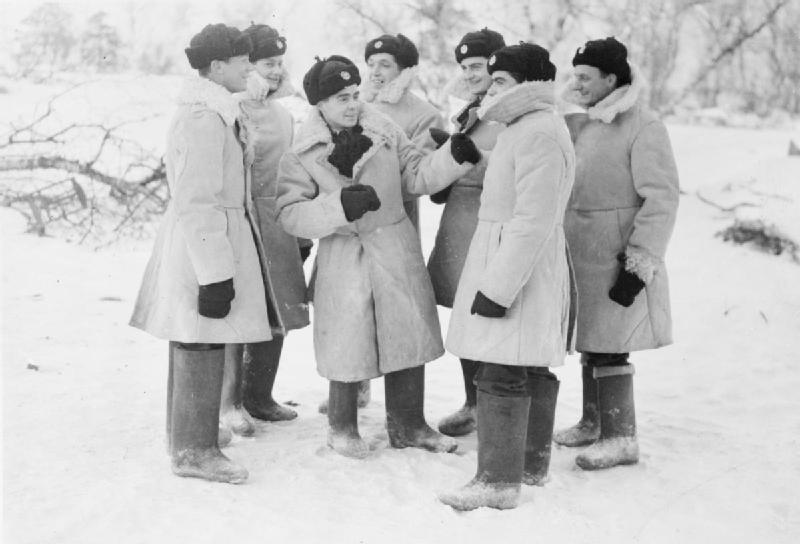
Haw stands third left in this group of RAF personnel wearing Russian winter clothing

In August the British War Cabinet agreed to supply 200 Hurricanes to the Soviet Union. Recognising that Soviet Air Forces personnel would need training in the maintenance and flying of the Hurricanes, it was decided to send a British expeditionary force with 40 examples of the aircraft to Russia for this purpose. No. 81 Squadron, along with No. 134 Squadron, were selected and these formed what was designated No. 151 Wing. The flying personnel of No. 81 Squadron departed the United Kingdom on 19 August aboard the aircraft carrier HMS Argus and flew their Hurricanes to Vaenga airfield, where the wing was to be based, on 7 September. Haw took off and landed without incident although one Hurricane ahead of him had to make a belly landing after it incurred damage to its undercarriage during the take off from Argus. At Vaenga the wing, in addition to its training function, was also tasked to assist in the aerial defence of the nearby port of Murmansk which was frequently attacked by Luftwaffe bombers.

No. 151 Wing was operational within days of its arrival of Vaenga. Haw was involved in its first combat on 12 September, when he was part of a group of No. 81 Squadron Hurricanes that engaged several German aircraft to the west of Murmansk. He shot down a Messerschmitt Bf 109 fighter, one of four German aircraft that were destroyed in the sortie. Haw destroyed another Bf 109 five days although considered himself fortunate to have survived the engagement; his success only came after his opponent had made an undetected approach and fired on his Hurricane. On a sortie to the northwest of Murmansk on 27 September, Haw shot down yet another Bf 109.

The operations of No. 151 Wing were reduced as winter approached and by the end of October all of the surviving Hurricanes of the original complement were handed over the Soviet Air Forces. After a period of indecision regarding the deployment of the RAF personnel, they were repatriated to the United Kingdom in late November. Haw was the most successful fighter pilot during the wing's deployment to Russia. In recognition of this, he was awarded the Distinguished Flying Medal in January 1942. The citation, published in The London Gazette, read:

This airman has been employed on operational flying since June, 1940. He fought in the Battle of Britain and since then he has participated in numerous convoy patrols and in escorts to bomber aircraft on daylight raids. He has destroyed 3 enemy aircraft. Flight Sergeant Haw has displayed admirable qualities as a fighter pilot.

— London Gazette, No. 35430, 23 January 1942

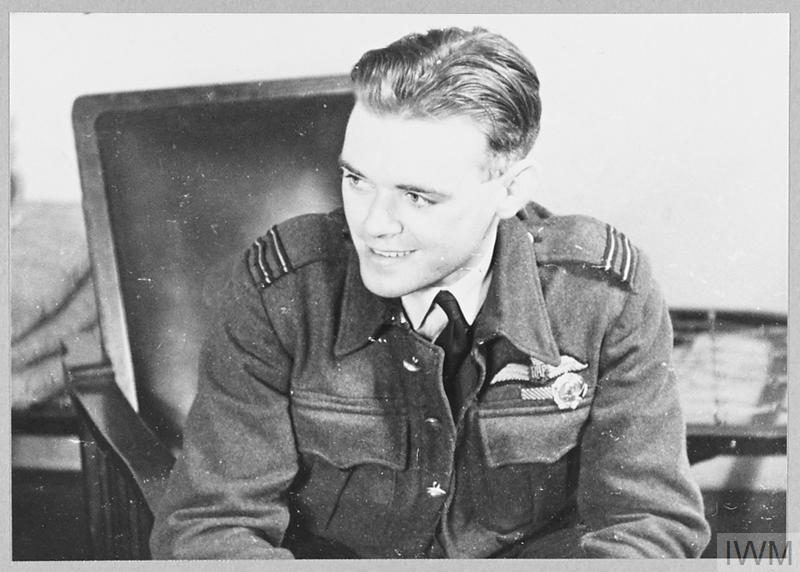
Haw wearing the ribbon of the Distinguished Flying Medal and the Order of Lenin

Commissioned as a pilot officer in March, Later that month he was also one of four RAF personnel to be awarded the Order of Lenin from the Soviet government, these being presented by the Soviet ambassador to the United Kingdom, Ivan Maisky.

=== Later war service ===
After his commissioning, Haw rejoined No. 504 Squadron. This was now based at Ballyhalbert and operating Supermarine Spitfire fighters on convoy patrols and search and rescue sorties. Haw's stay there was brief for after two months, he was posted to No. 122 Squadron as an acting flight lieutenant and commander of one of its flights. Based at Hornchurch, it flew Spitfires on offensive sorties to German-occupied Europe as part of the RAF's Circus offensive. It was involved in the Dieppe Raid of 19 August, flying several sorties, and received updated Spitfire IXs later in the year. Flying one of these on 20 January 1943, Haw damaged a Bf 109 off Daro. The next month Haw was promoted to acting squadron leader and given command of No. 611 Squadron, based at Biggin Hill. The squadron was mostly engaged in high altitude patrols and bomber escort duties with its Spitfires.

Haw was rested in May and sent on a tour of factories for several weeks, giving talks in aid of the war effort. In July he was posted to the Fighter Leaders School at Milfield. Upon completion of his course in November, with an appointment as commander of No. 129 Squadron. Another Spitfire squadron, this was based at Hornchurch and engaged in offensive operations, flying as escorts to bombers attacking targets in German-occupied Europe, until it was rested in January 1944 with an assignment to Peterhead in Scotland. Two months later Haw oversaw the squadron's conversion to the North American Mustang III fighter. It resumed operations in late April and was involved in the aerial coverage of the Normandy landings in June and then the following month was one of the squadrons engaged in Operation Diver, the RAF's campaign against the V-1 flying bomb.

Later in July Haw was rested and sent back to Fighter Leaders School, now at Tangmere as part of the Central Fighter Establishment. During his service here, he was awarded the Distinguished Flying Cross. The announcement was made in The London Gazette in October 1944. Haw's final months of war service were spent as an administrative officer at Horsham St Faith.

Haw ended the war credited with having destroyed four German aircraft and damaged two more, one being shared with another pilot.

== Postwar service ==
After the war, Haw's service in the RAF was extended and in September 1946 he was appointed commander of No. 65 Squadron. This was based at Church Fenton and operated Spitfires, but the following year it converted to the de Havilland Hornet heavy fighter. Haw, who had been granted a permanent commission as a flight lieutenant in the RAF in June 1948, began to have trouble with his eyesight and soon was no longer able to fly. He relinquished his commission in the RAF in September 1951.

== Later life ==
Returning to civilian life, Haw ran a pub in Sussex for a number of years. Then, in 1957, he purchased a boarding kennel and concurrently with operating this facility, developed a pet food wholesale and retail business. He rejoined the RAFVR in February 1959 for a four-year term, being appointed to the training branch in the rank of a flying officer. He retired to Farnham, in Surrey, in 1985. The same year, as a recipient of the Order of Lenin he went to Moscow as a guest of the Soviet government to commemorate the 40th anniversary of the end of the Second World War. He died in November 1993.
