= No. 151 Wing RAF =

No. 151 Wing RAF

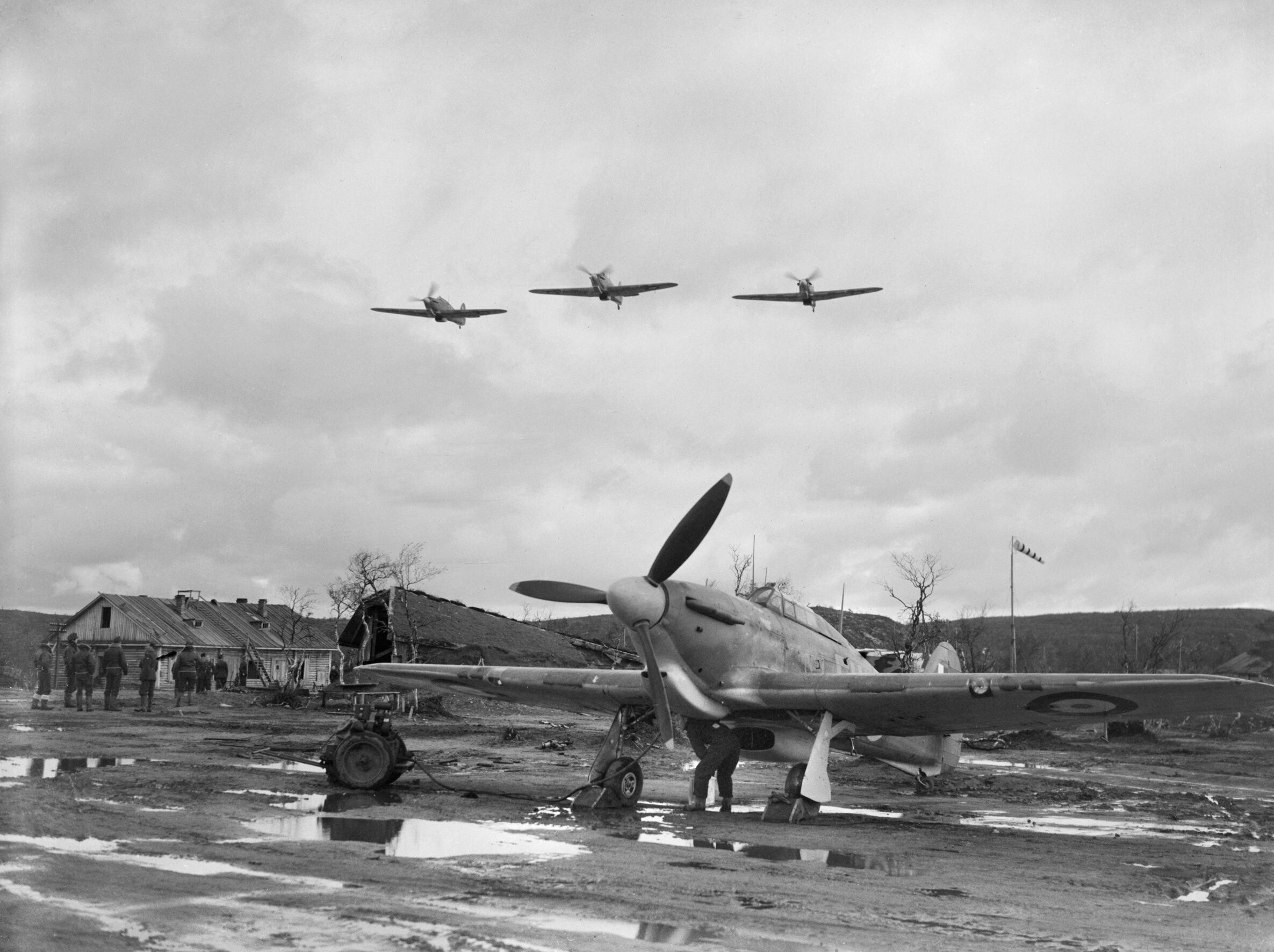
- No. 151 Wing Royal Air Force Operations in Russia, September–November 1941 (CR38)
- Active: 7 September 1941 – 22 October 1941; 10 March 1944 – 1 June 1946; 1 October 1959 – 9 September 1964
- Country: United Kingdom
- Branch: Royal Air Force
- Size: Wing

Commanders
- Notable commanders: Wing Commander Henry Neville Gynes Ramsbottom-Isherwood (1941)

Aircraft flown
- Fighter: Hawker Hurricane IIB (1941)

No 151 Wing Royal Air Force was a British unit which operated with the Soviet forces on the Kola Peninsula in the northern USSR during the first months of Operation Barbarossa, in the Second World War. Operation Benedict, the 1941 expedition to Murmansk, provided air defence for Allied ships as they were discharging at ports within range of Luftwaffe units in Norway and Finland.

The British party converted Soviet air and ground crews to British Hawker Hurricane IIB fighters and their Rolls-Royce Merlin engines, many of which were due to be delivered under British Lend-Lease arrangements.

In the five weeks of the operation, 151 Wing claimed 16 victories, four probables and seven aircraft damaged. Conversion of Soviet Air Forces (Voyenno-Vozdushnye Sily) pilots and ground crew to Hurricanes began in mid-October. At the end of November the RAF party returned to Britain, less some signals staff; the wing was then disbanded.

On 10 March 1944, 151 Wing was reformed in Iraq with transport aircraft, then disbanded again on 1 June 1946. From 1 October 1959 to 9 September 1964, 151 Wing was an air defence missile unit and was then disbanded for the last time.

== Background ==
On 22 June 1941, the Soviet Union was invaded by Nazi Germany and its allies. That evening, Winston Churchill broadcast a promise of assistance to the USSR against the common enemy. On 7 July, Churchill wrote to Stalin and ordered the British ambassador in Moscow, Stafford Cripps, to begin discussions for a treaty of mutual assistance. On 12 July, an Anglo-Soviet Agreement was signed in Moscow, to fight together and not make a separate peace. On the same day a Soviet commission met the Royal Navy and the RAF in London and it was decided to use the airfield at Vaenga (now Severomorsk) as a fighter base to defend ships unloading at the ports of Murmansk, Arkhangelsk and Polyarny. The First Sea Lord, Admiral Dudley Pound considered such proposals unsound, "with the dice loaded against us in every direction".

== Prelude ==
The Dervish convoy assembled at Reykjavik in Iceland, consisting of six merchant ships Lancastrian Prince, New Westminster City, Esneh, Trehata, the elderly Llanstephan Castle loaded with raw materials and 15 crated Hawker Hurricane fighter aircraft, the fleet oiler RFA Aldersdale and the Dutch freighter Alchiba. Departing for Russia on 21 August, the convoy was escorted by the destroyers HMS Electra, Active and Impulsive, the minesweepers Halcyon, Salamander and Harrier and the anti-submarine Shakespearian class trawlers HMT Hamlet, Macbeth and Ophelia. Distant cover came from the fleet carrier HMS Victorious and the cruisers HMS Devonshire and Suffolk. The old aircraft carrier HMS Argus (a veteran of the First World War) took part in the parallel Operation Strength with the heavy cruiser HMS Shropshire and the destroyers HMS Matabele, Punjabi and Somali. Strength delivered the personnel of No. 151 Wing RAF Royal Air Force to Russia and the 24 Hurricanes were flown off Argus to Vaenga (later renamed Severomorsk) airfield, near Murmansk. Due to the lack of Luftwaffe aerial reconnaissance aircraft in the region, the ships arrived safely.

== Operation Benedict ==
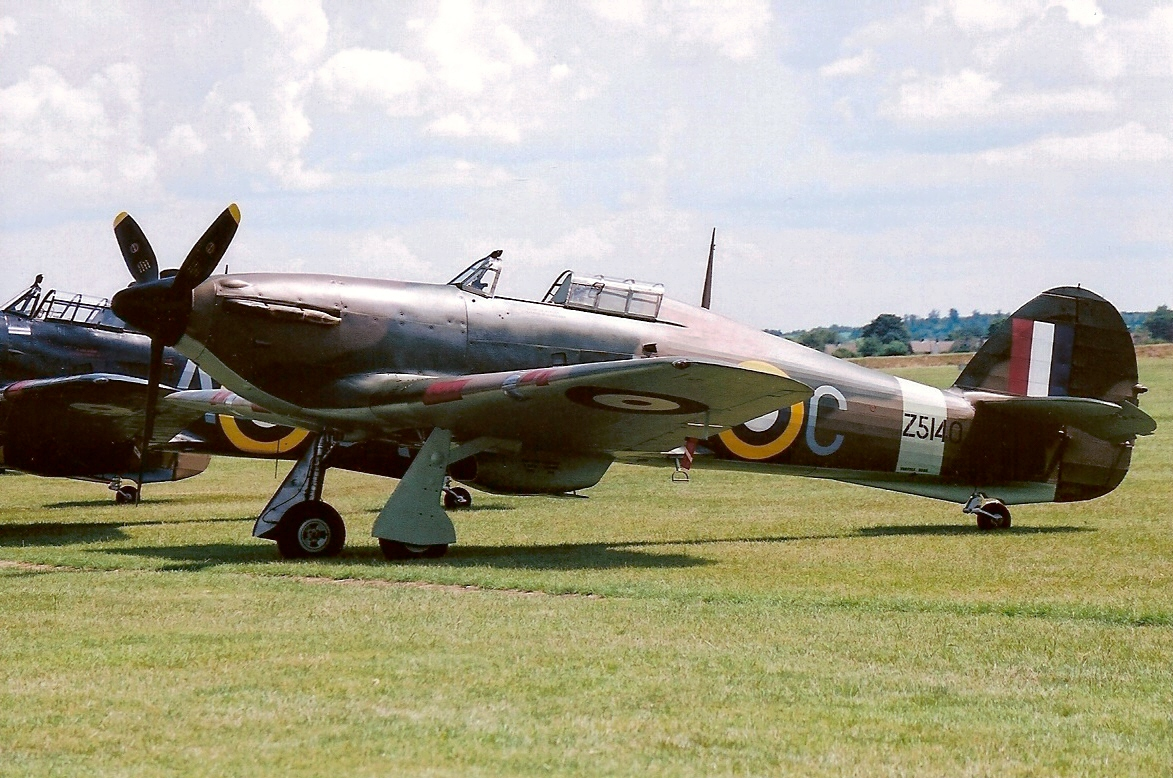
Preserved Hurricane Mk IIB Z5140

On 12 July 1941, a Soviet commission met representatives of the Royal Navy and the RAF in London and it was decided to use the Vaenga-1 airfield to defend Allied ships while unloading at the ports of Murmansk, Arkhangelsk and Polyarnoe. No. 151 Wing RAF (Neville Ramsbottom-Isherwood) was established, comprising 81 Squadron and 134 Squadron, equipped with Hawker Hurricanes. The pilots had come from 81 Squadron, 504 Squadron or had just completed their training. The wing was to be transported to north Russia in Operation Dervish, the first Arctic convoy, to operate until the weather in October or November grounded the aircraft. During the winter lull, the fighters were to be handed over to the Soviet Air Forces (VVS, Voyenno-Vozdushnye Sily).

The majority of the airmen embarked on the steamship SS Llanstephan Castle together with 15 Hurricanes packed in crates, at the Scapa Flow anchorage in the Orkney Islands. The remaining 24 aircraft went on board the aircraft carrier Argus as part of Operation Strength, in which the carrier, a cruiser and three destroyers, carried the RAF party. The ships departed from Scapa Flow on 17 August 1941 and the Hurricanes from Argus landed at Vaenga, about 17 mi (27 km) from Murmansk to find a large and fairly well equipped airfield occupied by a medium bomber squadron. Luftwaffe attacks on Dervish led to the ships docking at Archangelsk 400 mi (640 km) to the east. No facilities existed for the assembly of the crated Hurricanes; improvisation and the co-operation of the local Russians overcame the lack of specialist equipment, such as airscrew spanners and the job took nine days. The aircraft were flown to Vaenga on 12 September, except for two Hurricanes, whose pilots succumbed to Russian hospitality at a refuelling stop and had to continue the morning after.

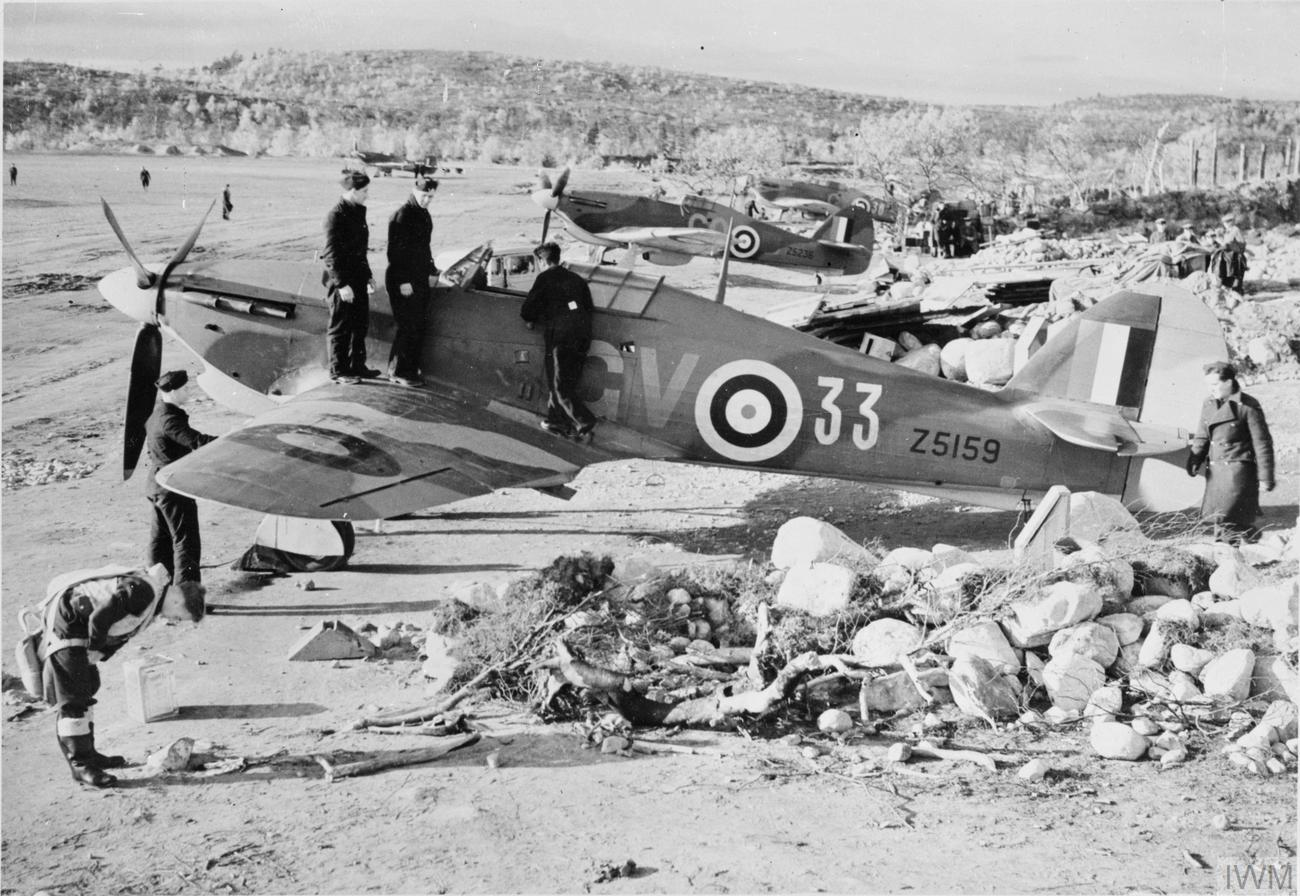
Hurricanes of 134 Squadron RAF at Vaenga, 1941

Vaenga airfield had an adequate surface of compacted sand which became very bumpy in wet weather. Airfield facilities were linked by a tarmac road but beyond the perimeter there were only cart tracks. Accommodation was in brick buildings but wooden huts were found to be unkempt. Bedding was new, the food was ample, though some considered to be a little greasy and the sanitation was hideous, leading to the British naming the main latrine, directly over a cesspit, "The Kremlin". Co-operation from the Russians was excellent and Isherwood established rapport with the Soviet commanding general and gained the agreement of the Russians on bomber escort tactics.

Within 24 hours of commencing operations, the wing shot down its first German aircraft. On 12 September, five Hurricanes of 81 Squadron intercepted a Henschel reconnaissance aircraft and five Messerschmitt Bf 109 escorts from Petsamo. The Hurricanes carried only six of their battery of eight machine-guns but shot down three Bf 109s and damaged the Henschel for a loss of one aircraft and pilot. In its five weeks of operations, the wing claimed 16 victories, four probables and seven aircraft damaged. The winter snows began on 22 September and the conversion of VVS pilots and ground crew to Hurricanes began in mid-October. In late November the RAF party returned, less various signals staff. During a scramble, the pilot of a 134 Squadron Hurricane taxied with two airmen sitting on the tail to counter the bumpy surface. The pilot took off unaware that the airmen were still there and crashed soon after, the pilot being seriously injured and the airmen killed.

== Aftermath ==
=== Analysis ===
Number 151 Wing "carried out 365 sorties during its stay at Vaenga, claiming 11 Messerschmitt fighters and three Ju 88 bombers shot down" The main objectives of the 1941 expedition to Murmansk, were to show the quality of the Hurricane aircraft when properly handled and to train Soviet pilots and their ground crews on the British military equipment, that would soon be supplied to the Soviet Union. The operation was judged to have fulfilled these objectives. Only 81 Squadron received the battle honour 'Russia, 1941'. The Soviet Union recognised the contribution of 151 Wing by the awards of the Order of Lenin to Wing Commander Ramsbottom-Isherwood, Squadron Leaders A. H. Rook and A. G. Miller and Flight Sergeant Charlton Haw. In 1944, the Engineering Officer in charge of assembling the Hurricanes, Flight Lieutenant Gittins, was awarded the Order of the Red Star.

=== Subsequent operations ===
On 5 July 1942, No. 153 Wing RAF was raised in England with the intention of resuming RAF operations on the front. This was a force of four squadrons of Supermarine Spitfires and two squadrons of ground-attack Hurricanes. This would have involved around 2,000 Commonwealth personnel. Possibly due to increased convoy casualties, the operation was called off and 153 Wing was stood down.

=== Operation Orator ===
On 2 September 1942, two Bomber Command units, 144 Squadron and 455 Squadron, Royal Australian Air Force, flew 32 Handley Page Hampdens from Britain to Murmansk. The Hampdens had been refurbished as torpedo-bombers and Operation Orator was designed to cover Convoy PQ 18. The Admiralty did not want a repeat of the tragedy that befell Convoy PQ 17, destroyed by the U-boats and Luftwaffe. The British wanted to protect the convoy from the German surface fleet, especially the battleship Tirpitz. Nine Hampdens were lost en route, due mainly to harsh Arctic weather, compass failures, German fighters and anti-aircraft fire. The squadrons operated briefly from Vaenga air base, before handing their Hampdens over to the Soviet Air Force. Commonwealth aircrew under RAF command remained active in the Murmansk area until 1944, operating Catalina, Lockheed Hudson and photoreconnaissance Spitfire aircraft from Vaenga and Lakhta, supporting Arctic convoys with maritime patrol and escort flying.

== 151 Wing redux ==
No. 151 Wing was reformed on 10 March 1944 as a transport wing headquartered at RAF Habbaniya in Iraq, and operated until its disbanding on 1 June 1946. From 1 October 1959 to 9 September 1964, 151 Wing was an air defence missile unit based at RAF North Luffenham, controlling 62 Squadron at RAF Woolfox Lodge and 257 Squadron at RAF Warboys, equipped with Bristol Bloodhound surface-to-air missiles.

== See also ==
- Normandie-Niemen, another Western air squadron operating on the Eastern Front.
- List of Wings of the Royal Air Force

== Bibliography ==
Books

- Darling, Kev (2012). RAF Strike Command 1968–2007 Aircraft, Men and Action. Barnsley: Pen & Sword Aviation (Pen & Sword Books). ISBN 978-1-84884-898-6.
- Golley, J. (1987). Hurricanes over Murmansk (1st ed.). Wellingborough: Patrick Stephens. ISBN 978-0-85059-832-2.
- Richards, Denis; Saunders, H. St G. (1975) [1954]. Royal Air Force 1939–1945: The Fight Avails. Vol. II (pbk. ed.). London: HMSO. ISBN 978-0-11-771593-6.
- Roskill, S. W. (1957) [1954]. Butler, J. R. M. (ed.). The War at Sea 1939–1945: The Defensive. History of the Second World War United Kingdom Military Series. Vol. I (4th impr. ed.). London: HMSO. OCLC 881709135.
- Woodman, Richard (2004) [1994]. Arctic Convoys 1941–1945. London: John Murray. ISBN 978-0-7195-5752-1.

Websites

- Sheppard, Mark (2016). "RAF Hurricanes in Russia". Lend-Lease on airforce.ru. Archived from the original on 27 October 2015.
