= Leonard Isitt =

Leonard Isitt may refer to:

- Leonard Isitt (minister) (1855–1937), New Zealand Member of Parliament and Methodist minister
- Sir Leonard Isitt (aviator) (1891–1976), New Zealand senior air force commander
