= Alan Peart =

New Zealand fighter pilot

Alan Peart DFC
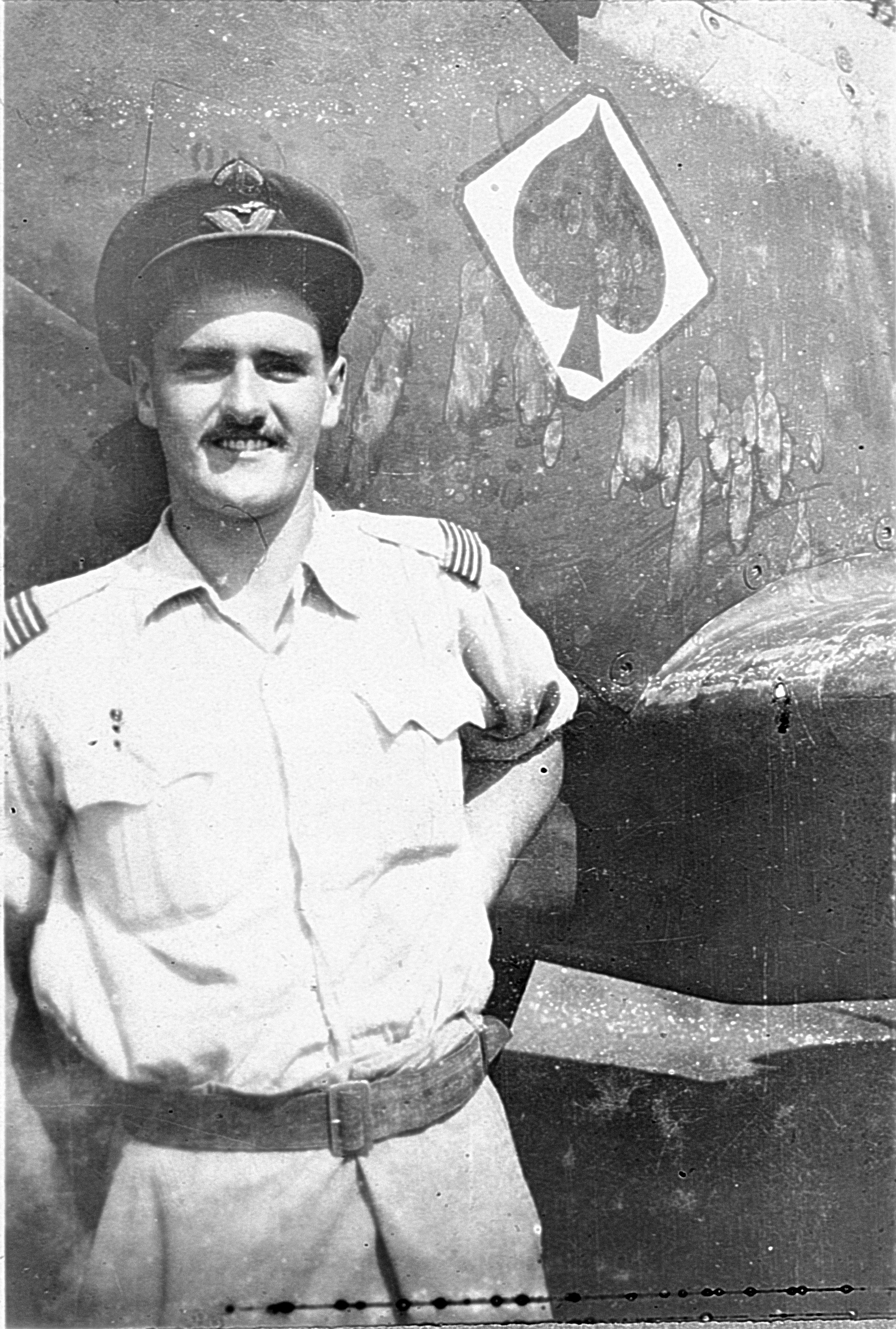
- Alan Peart standing beside his Spitfire Mk.VIII, No. 81 Squadron, Ceylon, c. 1944
- Born: 25 July 1922; Nelson, New Zealand
- Died: 5 September 2018 (aged 96); Hamilton, New Zealand
- Military career
- Allegiance: New Zealand
- Branch: Royal New Zealand Air Force
- Service years: 1941–1945
- Rank: Flight lieutenant
- Units: No. 610 Squadron; No. 81 Squadron
- Conflicts: Second World War; Channel Front; North African Campaign; Invasion of Sicily; Burma Campaign
- Awards: Distinguished Flying Cross

Alan McGregor Peart, DFC (25 July 1922 – 5 September 2018) was a New Zealand fighter pilot and flying ace of the Second World War. He served in Europe with No. 610 Squadron, and with No. 81 Squadron in North Africa, Malta, Sicily, Italy and the Far East. He is credited with the destruction of six enemy aircraft, plus a share in another aircraft destroyed. He is also notable for having shot down aircraft from all three main Axis powers—Germany, Italy and Japan.

== Early life ==
Alan McGregor Peart was born in Nelson, New Zealand, on 25 July 1922. He was educated at the Hamilton Technical High School, and played rugby. After completing his schooling, he worked as a draughting cadet at the Tauranga branch of the Department of Public Works. He also served in the Territorial Force, as a private in the Hauraki Battalion.

== Second World War ==
Peart joined the Royal New Zealand Air Force (RNZAF) in May 1941. According to his memoirs, he was selected to be trained as a bomber pilot but protested to the commander of the flying school. He successfully advocated that he be sent for training as a fighter pilot instead. After completing his training, he was sent to England to serve with the Royal Air Force. He received further flight training at Hullavington and then proceeded to No. 55 Operational Training Unit at Annan in Scotland, learning to operate the Hawker Hurricane fighter.

In June 1942, Peart was posted to No. 610 Squadron with the rank of sergeant pilot. Commanded by Squadron Leader Johnnie Johnson, the squadron operated the Supermarine Spitfire fighter. He was involved in numerous sorties to continental Europe, including providing aerial cover for the Dieppe Raid in August, until November when he was transferred to No. 81 Squadron, at the time based in Algeria and operating Spitfire Vbs from Maison Blanche, near Algiers.

=== Mediterranean ===
On 1 December, Peart destroyed an Italian Savoia-Marchetti SM.84 bomber over Bone Harbour and damaged another. On 31 December he damaged a Messerschmitt Bf 109 fighter while flying the personal aircraft of Wing Commander Petrus Hugo. The following year, the squadron's Spitfire Vbs were replaced by the superior Spitfire IX. By this time Peart had been commissioned and was now a pilot officer. On 23 April 1943, he damaged a Bf 109 and two days later destroyed another near Medjez-el-Bab. Soon afterwards, the squadron shifted to the island of Malta and began flying operations to Sicily and Italy as the Italian campaign commenced. Some of the squadron's Spitfires had to be exchanged with the older Spitfire Vcs.

During the invasion of Sicily on 10 July, No. 81 Squadron helped protect the landings. While on patrol on 16 July, No. 81 Squadron encountered a dozen Bf 109s; Peart damaged one of them, when flying one of the older Spitfire Vcs. A few days later, the squadron began operating from Sicily itself. While escorting Douglas Boston bombers over the Gulf of Saint Euphemia on 28 August, Peart, back in a Spitfire IX, was among eight Spitfires that fended off an attack by a group of Bf 109s, destroying one of them in the process. On 13 September, when leading a flight of six Spitfires, he helped two other pilots destroy one of three Dornier Do 217 bombers attacking Allied shipping near the beachhead at Salerno. Afterwards he had to land at Salerno due to an overheating engine. He caught a ride back on a Douglas C47 transport back to his airfield.

=== Burma ===
In November 1943, No. 81 Squadron was transferred to India, re-equipped with Spitfire VIIIs. It arrived at the front, at Imphal, in January the following year. The Japanese invaded India on 4 February and the squadron sought to achieve air superiority, flying forward to temporary airstrips from which they operated during the day, returning to Imphal at night. On 13 February, Peart damaged two Nakajima Ki-43 fighters, known as Oscars. In March 1944, Peart was one of six pilots sent with their aircraft to an airstrip, named Broadway, in the jungle to support the operations of the Chindits. The following day, 30 Japanese Oscar fighters attacked the airstrip but forewarned, the Spitfires were already airborne and able to shoot down four of the enemy aircraft plus damaged others. Three days later, on 16 March, the Spitfires intercepted a group of Oscars, with Peart destroying one and damaging another. Poor weather later in the day saw the Spitfires fly to Imphal, returning the next day. On landing, they were surprised by several enemy fighters. Four of the six Spitfires were destroyed on the ground and a pilot killed but Peart and his squadron commander took off in time and shot down one Oscar. Peart's commander was shot down, leaving the New Zealander to fight a solo dogfight against the remaining Japanese. Later, it was decided to abandon the airstrip and provide support for the Chindits from Kangala instead.

The Japanese advance caused No. 81 Squadron to withdraw from Imphal and commence operations from Kumbhirgram, escorting transports into the Imphal valley and endeavouring to maintain air superiority. On 17 April he claimed one Oscar as destroyed and another damaged. He recorded 24 combat patrols for April and 20 for the first two weeks of May before he was withdrawn and sent to take a course at No. 1 Air Fighting Training Unit. In June 1944, Peart's award of the Distinguished Flying Cross (DFC) was announced. The citation for his DFC, published in The London Gazette, read:

Flying Officer Peart is a keen and courageous fighter who has destroyed five enemy aircraft and damaged several more. He has taken part in a very large number of sorties and set a fine example of courage and devotion to duty throughout.

— London Gazette, No. 36542, 2 June 1944.

Soon after being awarded the DFC, Peart completed his course and returned to No. 81 Squadron as a qualified instructor. However in August, just over a month after his return, the squadron was withdrawn to Ceylon for a rest. Peart was posted to India where he took command of a fighter conversion and tactical flight, based at Poona. Due to illness, he was repatriated back to New Zealand in February 1945. On recovering his health, he briefly served as an instructor and was discharged from the RNZAF later that year with the rank of flight lieutenant. He ended the war credited with the destruction of six enemy aircraft, a share in a seventh destroyed and nine damaged.

== Later life ==
Returning to civilian life Peart gained a degree in engineering from the University of New Zealand in 1949. He then worked as a civil engineer for the Ministry of Works. Among the projects he worked on were the construction of the Maraetai Power Station and the Auckland International Airport. He retired in 1982. He was involved in veteran's affair, being the president of the Burma Star Veterans association for a time. In his later years, he wrote a book on his wartime experiences, which was titled From North Africa to the Arakan and published in 2008. He was featured in a documentary film, released in 2018, about the Spitfire. He died on 5 September 2018.
