= 1940 Birthday Honours (New Zealand) =

Awards list for New Zealand

The 1940 King's Birthday Honours in New Zealand, celebrating the official birthday of King George VI, were appointments made by the King to various orders and honours in recognition of war service by New Zealanders. They were announced on 9 July 1940. No civilian awards were made.

The recipients of honours are displayed here as they were styled before their new honour.

== Order of the British Empire ==
=== Knight Commander (KBE) ===
Military division, additional

- Major General John Evelyn Duigan CB DSO – New Zealand Staff Corps; Chief of the General Staff, New Zealand Military Forces.
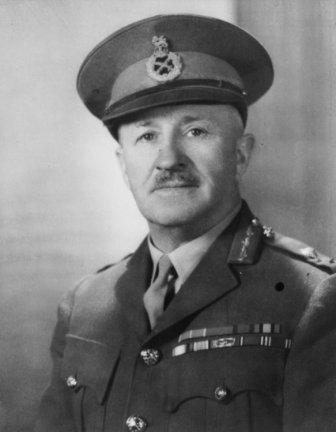
Sir John Duigan

=== Commander (CBE) ===
Military division, additional

- Group Captain Leonard Monk Isitt – Royal New Zealand Air Force.
- Colonel Owen Herbert Mead DSO – New Zealand Staff Corps; adjutant-general of the New Zealand Military Forces.
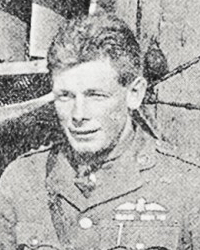
Leonard Monk Isitt

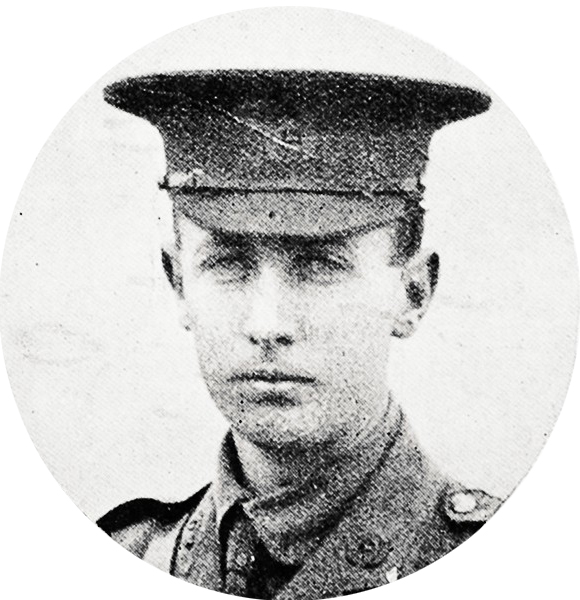
Owen Mead

=== Officer (OBE) ===
Military division, additional

- Wing Commander Hugh Bartholomew Burrell – Royal New Zealand Air Force.
- Lieutenant Colonel Albert Edward Conway – New Zealand Staff Corps; director of mobilisation of the New Zealand Military Forces.
- Lieutenant Herbert Albert Haynes – Royal Navy (retired).
- Major James George McKay VD – New Zealand Military Forces.
- The Reverend George Trevor Robson MC – New Zealand Chaplains Department; chaplain to the New Zealand Naval Forces.
Hugh Bartholomew Burrell

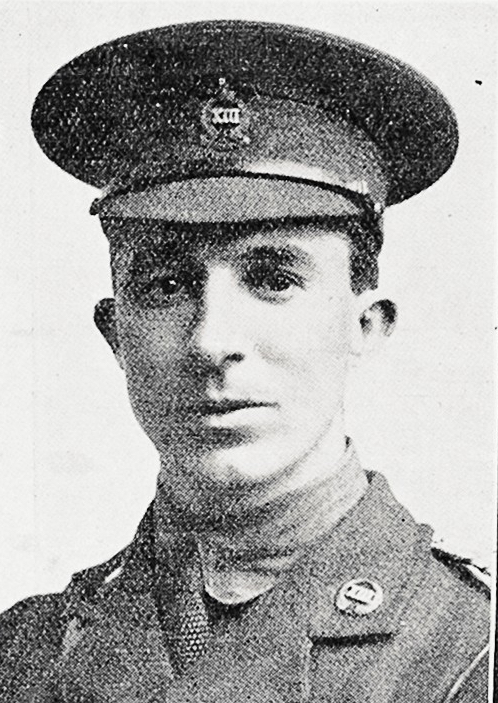
Albert Conway

=== Member (MBE) ===
Military division, additional

- Warrant Officer James Edward Duncan – Royal New Zealand Air Force.
- Flying Officer Albert Tom Giles – Royal New Zealand Air Force.
- Warrant Officer Class I (Staff-Sergeant-Major) William Leonard Glanville – Permanent Staff, New Zealand Military Forces.
- Commissioned Gunner Alfred James Harvey – Royal Navy.
- Squadron Sergeant-Major Charles Ethelbert Howell – Canterbury Yeomanry Cavalry, New Zealand Military Forces.
- Flight Lieutenant Ivan Edward Rawnsley – Royal New Zealand Air Force.
- Warrant Officer Class I (Regimental Sergeant-Major) Frank Allan Wetherall – Royal New Zealand Artillery, New Zealand Military Forces.

== Air Force Cross (AFC) ==
- Flight Lieutenant James Richard Maling – Royal Air Force.
- Squadron Leader James Francis Moir – Royal Air Force.
- Squadron Leader Henry Neville Gynes Ramsbottom-Isherwood – Royal Air Force.
