= Leonard Isitt (aviator) =

New Zealand military aviator (1891–1976)

Air Vice Marshal Sir Leonard Isitt KBE
- AVM Sir Leonard Monk Isitt
- Born: Leonard Monk Isitt; 27 July 1891; Christchurch, New Zealand
- Died: 21 January 1976 (aged 84); Lower Hutt, New Zealand
- Military career
- Branch: New Zealand Army; Royal New Zealand Air Force
- Service years: 1915–1946
- Rank: Air Vice Marshal
- Commands: Chief of the Air Staff
- Conflicts: World War I World War II
- Awards: Knight Commander of the Order of the British Empire
- Other work: Chairman of Tasman Empire Airways

Air Vice Marshal Sir Leonard Monk Isitt (27 July 1891 – 21 January 1976) was a New Zealand military aviator and senior air force commander. In 1943 he became the first New Zealander to serve as the Chief of the Air Staff of the Royal New Zealand Air Force, a post he held until 1946. At the close of World War II, Isitt was the New Zealand signatory to the Japanese Instrument of Surrender. After the war, following retirement from the Air Force, he worked as chairman of the New Zealand National Airways Corporation and Tasman Empire Airways.

== Early life ==
Leonard Monk Isitt was born on 27 July 1891 in Christchurch, New Zealand, the son of the Methodist minister, member of parliament and prohibitionist Leonard Monk Isitt and Agnes Martha Caverhill. Leonard Monk Isitt junior was educated at Mostyn House, Cheshire, England and Christchurch Boys' High School. He had one brother, Willard Whitmore Isitt (1894–1916), who was a Rifleman in the New Zealand Rifle Brigade in World War I and was killed in France on 31 October 1916.

== World War I and air force service ==
Following the outbreak of World War I he enlisted in April 1915 in the New Zealand Army and was assigned to the New Zealand Rifle Brigade. After service in Egypt he then moved to the Western Front where he was wounded in the head during the New Zealand Division's participation in the Battle of Flers–Courcelette. The scalp wound resulted in him being sent to England to recover, where he was discharged from the NZEF in March 1917.

On 10 May 1917 he was granted a probationary commission in the Royal Flying Corps as a second lieutenant, which was confirmed a month later. He was assigned as a pilot to a reconnaissance squadron with most of his duties involving artillery cooperation. During his period he shot down a single enemy aircraft, before being transferred back to England to serve as a flying instructor. After volunteering for frontline service he was assigned to 98 squadron in October 1917, flying the DH.9 on bombing missions. Based at Abscon airfield he flew his first mission on 9 October when 10 aircraft attacked Mons railway station. During the raid they were attacked by 15 Fokkers and Pfalzes. Two other major raids followed on 14 and 23 October. The later raid, was on the Hirson railway station, which saw two aircraft of the squadron shot down. In addition to these bombing flights he was also undertaking aerial reconnaissance.

In 1918 he was transferred to the Royal Air Force.

== Inter-war years ==
At the close of World War I, New Zealand had no military air organisation of any sort. On the request of the New Zealand government, the British Air Ministry sent Colonel (later Group Captain) A. V. Bettington to New Zealand to advise on the establishment of an air service. Bettington brought four aircraft with him and they were based at Sockburn airfield (later to become RNZAF Station Wigram). In 1919 Isitt, then a captain, was posted back to New Zealand where he was sent to Sockburn airfield to take care of the four aircraft and serve as commanding officer. Additionally Isitt served as the liaison officer to the Canterbury Aviation Company on behalf of the government.

Between the wars, one of Isitt's responsibilities was pilot flight training and he served in the Air Ministry, the New Zealand Permanent Air Force (NZPAF) and the RNZAF. In 1937, the RNZAF was made independent of the New Zealand Army and at that time Isitt was promoted to wing commander and appointed as the Air Member for Personnel. In the pre-World War II build up this was a key post and Isitt was soon promoted again to group captain.

== World War II ==
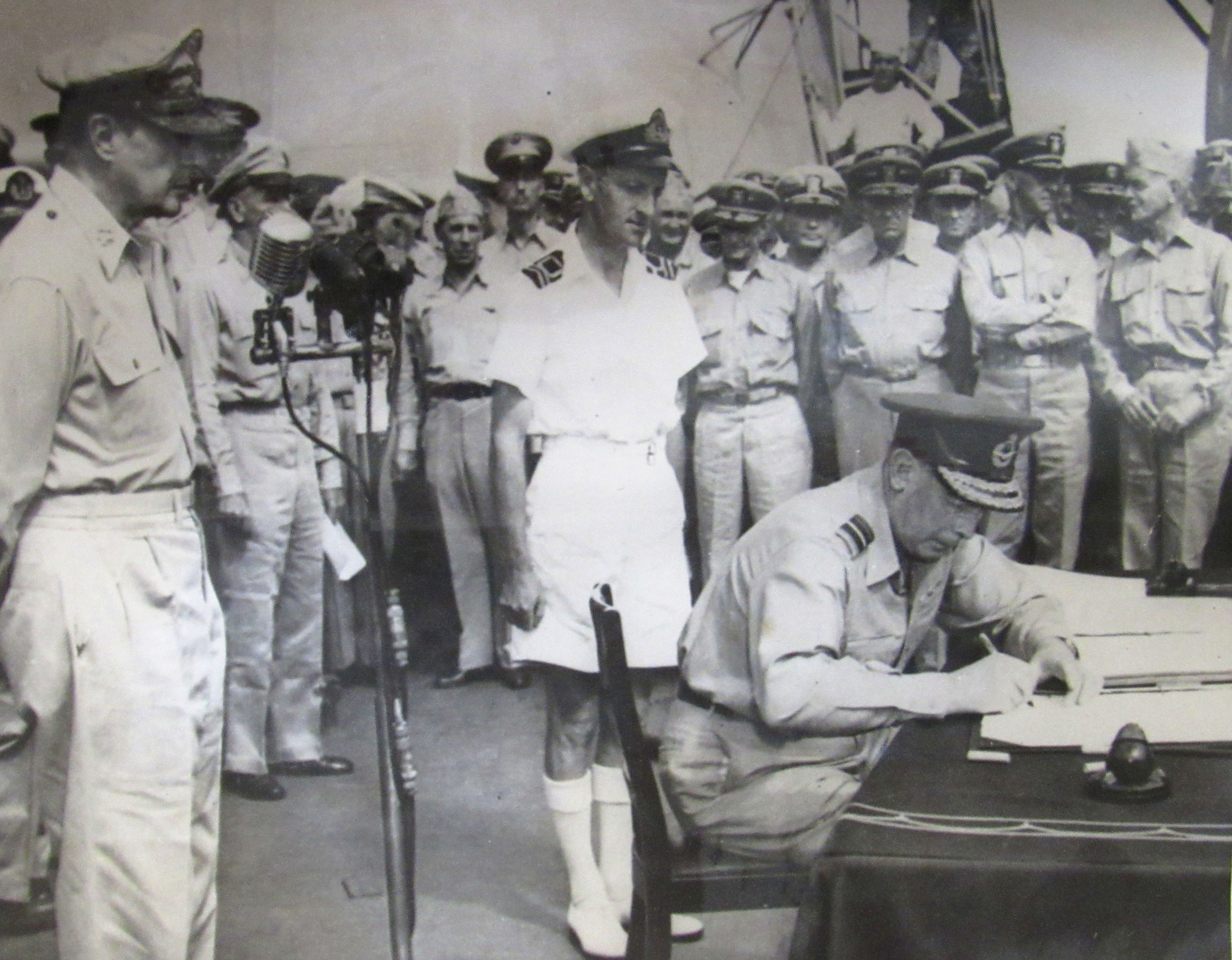
Tokyo Bay, Japan – Surrender of Japanese aboard USS Missouri. Air Vice Marshal Leonard M. Isitt, representing the Dominion of New Zealand, signs the instrument of surrender.

Continuing as Air Member for Personnel at the start of World War II, in March 1940 Isitt went to Canada as he had been appointed as New Zealand's representative on the board of Empire Air Training Scheme, a massive aviation training programme. In May 1942 Isitt was sent to London to establish the RNZAF's Overseas Headquarters, receiving a promotion to air commodore at the same time. Having accomplished his task, under a year later Isitt was back in New Zealand and in March 1943 Isitt became the New Zealand's Deputy Chief of Air Staff working under the then Chief of the Air Staff, Air Commodore Victor Goddard, a British officer on secondment. Around four months later on 19 July 1943 Isitt was appointed Chief of Air Staff of the Royal New Zealand Air Force in the rank of air vice-marshal. He was the first New Zealander to hold his Service's senior appointment and the first to hold one of the air marshal ranks. In addition to securing a significant role for his Air Force in the South Pacific, Isitt represented New Zealand at conferences in London, Washington and Ottawa during World War II.

He was the New Zealand signatory to the Japanese Instrument of Surrender on the USS Missouri marking the formal surrender of Japanese forces, so ending World War II.

== Post war ==
Isitt retired in 1946 as Chief of the Air Staff and he became chairman of New Zealand National Airways Corporation in 1946 and Tasman Empire Airways (TEAL) in 1947. He continued as TEAL chairman until 1963 when he was succeeded by Sir Andrew McKee.

Following his retirement as chairman of NAC and TEAL he served as chairman of Standard–Triumph New Zealand, Motor Assemblies Limited and then Leyland Motors of New Zealand until his final retirement in 1966.

Together with Ronald Bannerman and Keith Caldwell he was instrumental in establishing the New Zealand 1914–1918 Airmen's Association in 1960.

He died at Lower Hutt on 21 January 1976.

== Personal life ==
Isitt married Elsie Gladys Caverhill (1896–1970) at Wellington on 26 April 1920. They had two daughters.

== Honours and awards ==
In 1935, Isitt was awarded the King George V Silver Jubilee Medal. He was appointed a Commander of the Order of the British Empire in the 1940 King's Birthday Honours, and a Knight Commander of the Order of the British Empire in the 1946 New Year Honours. In 1953, he was awarded the Queen Elizabeth II Coronation Medal. His medals are held at the Air Force Museum of New Zealand. A road at the Hobsonville airbase was named after Isitt. A nearby gully also bears his name.

== Notes ==
Military offices
New title Air Force established	Air Member for Personnel; 1937–1940	Succeeded by Edward George Olson
New title Headquarters established	Air Officer Commanding RNZAF Overseas Headquarters; 1942	Succeeded by Arthur de Terrotte Nevill
Preceded by Victor Goddard	Chief of the Air Staff; 1943–1946	Succeeded by Arthur de Terrotte Nevill
Business positions
Unknown	Chairman of Tasman Empire Airways; 1947–1963	Succeeded by Sir Andrew McKee
