= No. 81 Squadron RAF =

British flying squadron, 1917–1970

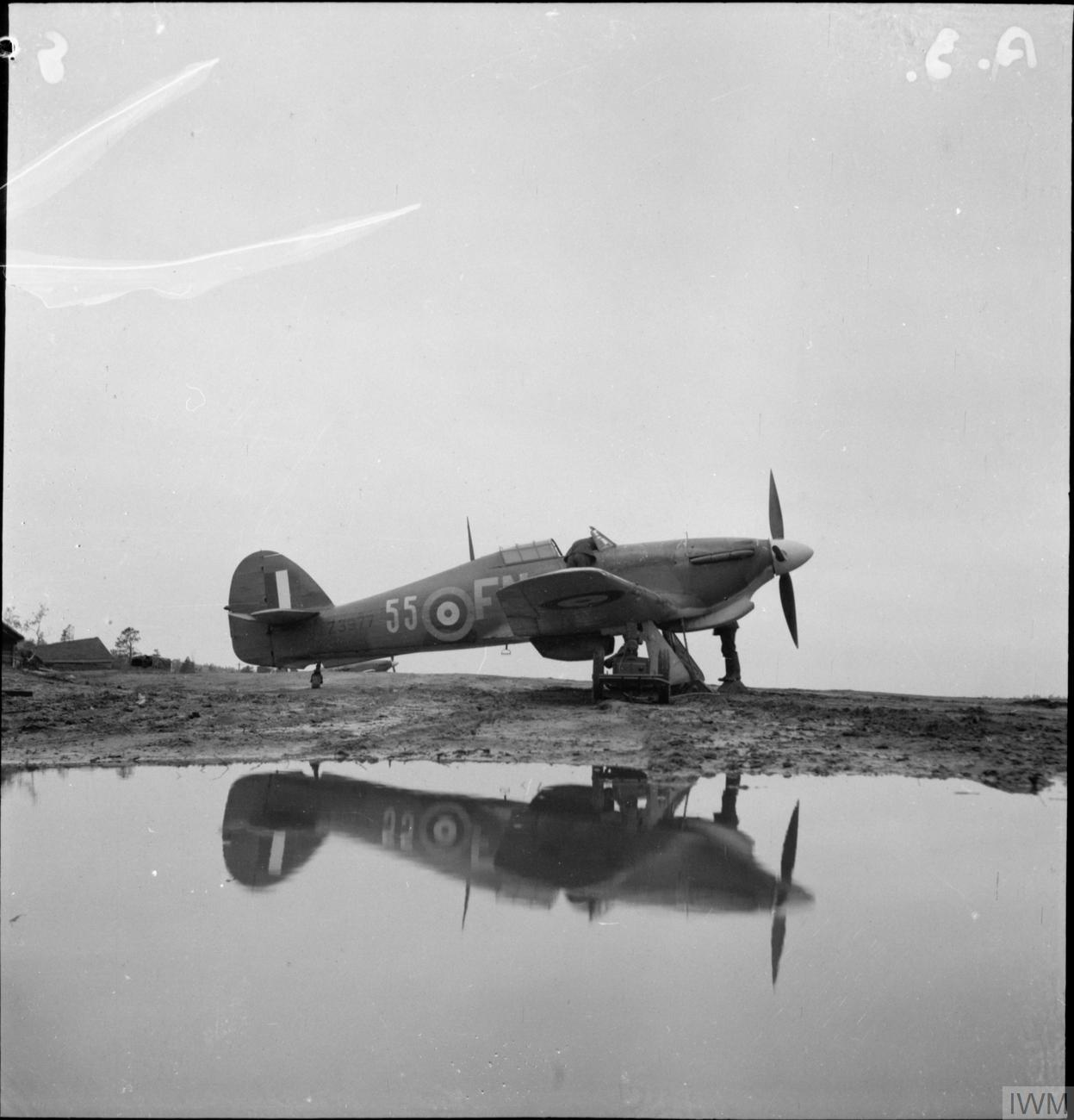
- A Hawker Hurricane of No. 81 Squadron at Vaenga in Russia, late 1941
- Active: 7 January 1917 – 4 July 1918; 25 Nov 1918 – 1 February 1920; 1 Dec 1939 – 15 June 1940; 29 July 1941 – 20 June 1945; 20 June 1945 – 30 June 1946; 1 September 1946 – 16 Jan 1970
- Country: United Kingdom
- Branch: Royal Air Force
- Mottos: Latin: Non Solum Nobis ("Not for us alone")
- Battle honours: France & Low Countries, 1939-40 Russia, 1941; Fortress Europe, 1942; Home Defence, 1942; Channel & North Sea, 1942; Dieppe; North Africa, 1942–43; Mediterranean, 1943; Sicily, 1943; Salerno; Italy, 1943; Burma 1944; Arakan, 1944; North Burma, 1944 Manipur, 1944

Insignia
- Identification symbol: Badge: An erect dagger in front of a mullet.

No 81 Squadron was a squadron of the Royal Air Force. It flew fighter aircraft during the Second World War, reconnaissance aircraft in the Far East after the war, and was disbanded in 1970.

== History ==
=== First World War ===
No. 81 Squadron Royal Flying Corps was formed on 7 January 1917 at Gosport as a training unit, but unlike many other Training squadrons during the First World War, it was not mobilised for active service and was disbanded on 4 July 1918.

The squadron reformed 25 November 1918 with all Canadian personnel and was officially known as No. 1 Squadron, Canadian Air Force until disbanding again on 1 February 1920.

=== Second World War ===
The rebirth of No. 81 Squadron seemingly can be traced to the Air Component Field Force Communication Squadron RAF formed in August 1939, probably associated with the British Expeditionary Force Air Component under Air Vice-Marshal Charles Blount (see British Air Forces in France).

On 1 December 1939 the Communications Squadron at Mountjoie, France operating de Havilland Tiger Moths, was redesignated No. 81 Squadron. It was disbanded on 15 June 1940, when the advancing German forces forced its withdrawal to the United Kingdom.

Following the German Invasion of the Soviet Union, it was decided to send a wing of Hawker Hurricane fighters to assist the Soviet war effort, and No. 81 Squadron, commanded by Squadron Leader Anthony Rook, reformed at RAF Leconfield on 29 July 1941 as part of No. 151 Wing RAF. In September the squadron embarked on the carrier HMS Argus, which transported them towards Murmansk in Northwest Russia, deploying them to Vaenga Airfield as part of Operation Benedict. The wing flew both defensive sorties and escort missions for Soviet bombers, while carrying out its principal role of training Soviet pilots on the Hurricane. After a few weeks of operations the Hurricanes were handed over to the Soviets and the RAF personnel left to return to the UK at the end of November.

When the squadron arrived back in Britain, it was equipped with Supermarine Spitfires at RAF Turnhouse, Edinburgh, being declared operational on 1 February 1942. It moved to RAF Hornchurch near London in May, flying its first operation, escorting Hurricanes bombing Bruges on 1 June. At the end of October the Squadron moved to Gibraltar and on 8 November, 19 Spitfires moved to the newly captured airfield at Maison Blanche, Algiers. Following the German surrender in North Africa, it moved to Malta in preparation for the Invasion of Sicily. It then moved to Italy in September but was withdrawn to Egypt in November to prepare for deployment to the Far East. During operations in the Mediterranean, they found their most frequent opponents were Jagdgeschwader 53 who had an ace of spades motif on their aircraft. As the squadron commander considered that they had 'bested' their enemy, they took the motif and started applying it to their aircraft.

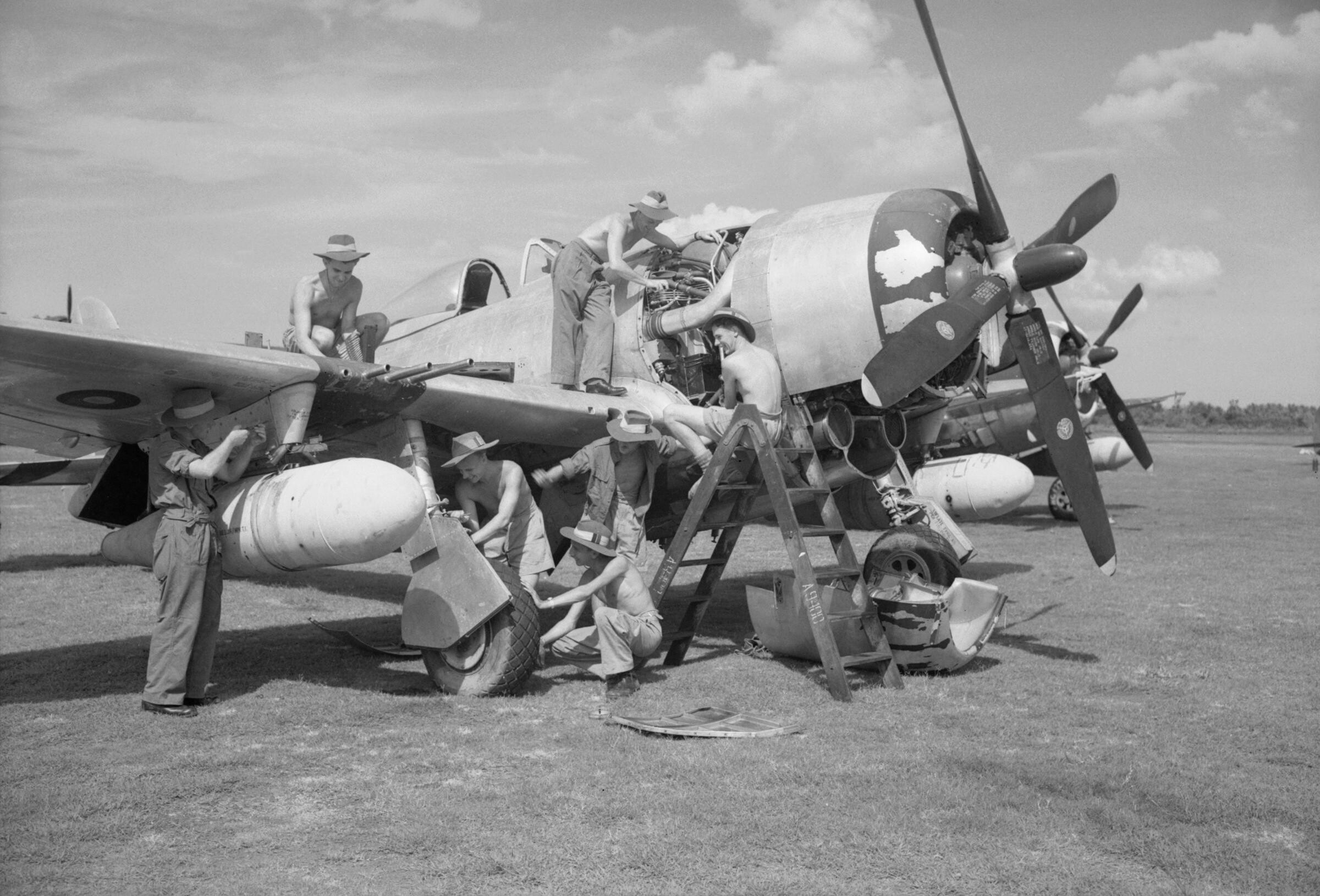
A Thunderbolt of No. 81 Squadron being prepared for action against Indonesian nationalists at Kemajoran airfield, Batavia

It arrived at Alipore, India in December 1943, equipped with more modern Spitfire VIII, starting operations in January, flying fighter and ground attack missions in support of the Second Battle of Arakan and the Battle of Imphal as part of the RAF Third Tactical Air Force. It was withdrawn to Ceylon in August and disbanded on 20 June 1945. On the same day 123 Squadron was renumbered 81 Squadron but its Thunderbolts did not become operational before the war ended. In October, the squadron was sent to Java during the Indonesian War of Independence, flying tactical reconnaissance duties and covering Allied road convoys, while attacking nationalist held airfields and ammunition dumps. On 30 June 1946, the squadron was again disbanded.

=== Postwar reconnaissance operations ===
On 1 September 1946, No. 684 Squadron, the Far east photo-reconnaissance squadron flying de Havilland Mosquito PR.34s and Spitfire PR.19s, was renumbered as No. 81. It added fighter-reconnaissance Spitfires in August 1947, when it became involved in the Malayan Emergency. Conversion to Meteor PR.10s began in September 1953, with the Squadron flying the RAF's last operational Spitfire mission on 1 April 1954 and the last operational RAF Mosquito mission on 15 December 1955. It received a few Percival Pembrokes for survey operations in 1956 and began converting to the English Electric Canberra in 1958, flying its last Meteor mission on 7 July 1961, retaining the Canberra until the Squadron was disbanded as part of Britain's withdrawal from bases East of Suez on 16 January 1970.

The Squadron was based at RAF Seletar and RAF Tengah in Singapore from 1947 to 1970 with a small detachment at RAF Kai Tak in Hong Kong from 1947 to 1954.

== Squadron insignia ==
The squadron insignia consists of sword on a red star. According to the memoirs of Alan McGregor Peart DFC, who served with the squadron in World War 2, the squadron had no formal insignia until 1943, when the members of the squadron decided to devise one. The red star was used as a symbol of the squadron's previous deployment to the Soviet Union, and the borrowed the rampant sword of the First Army in North Africa to represent the squadron's deployment in that theatre. The squadron's motto, Non Solum Nobis, is Latin for "not for ourselves alone".
