= No. 134 Squadron RAF =

British flying squadron, 1918

- Active: 1 March 1918 – 4 July 1918; 31 July 1941 – 10 March 1946
- Country: United Kingdom
- Branch: Royal Air Force
- Mottos: Latin: Per ardua volabimus ("We shall fly through hardships")

Insignia
- Squadron Badge: A gauntlet closed.
- Squadron Codes: G (August – November 1941); GQ (1942 – June 1945)

No. 134 Squadron RAF was a part of the Royal Air Force which was formed as a light bomber unit in World War I and reformed as a fighter squadron in World War II.

== History ==
=== First World War ===
No. 134 Squadron Royal Flying Corps was formed on 1 March 1918 and became a unit of the Royal Air Force a month later but disbanded on 17 August 1918.

=== Second World War ===
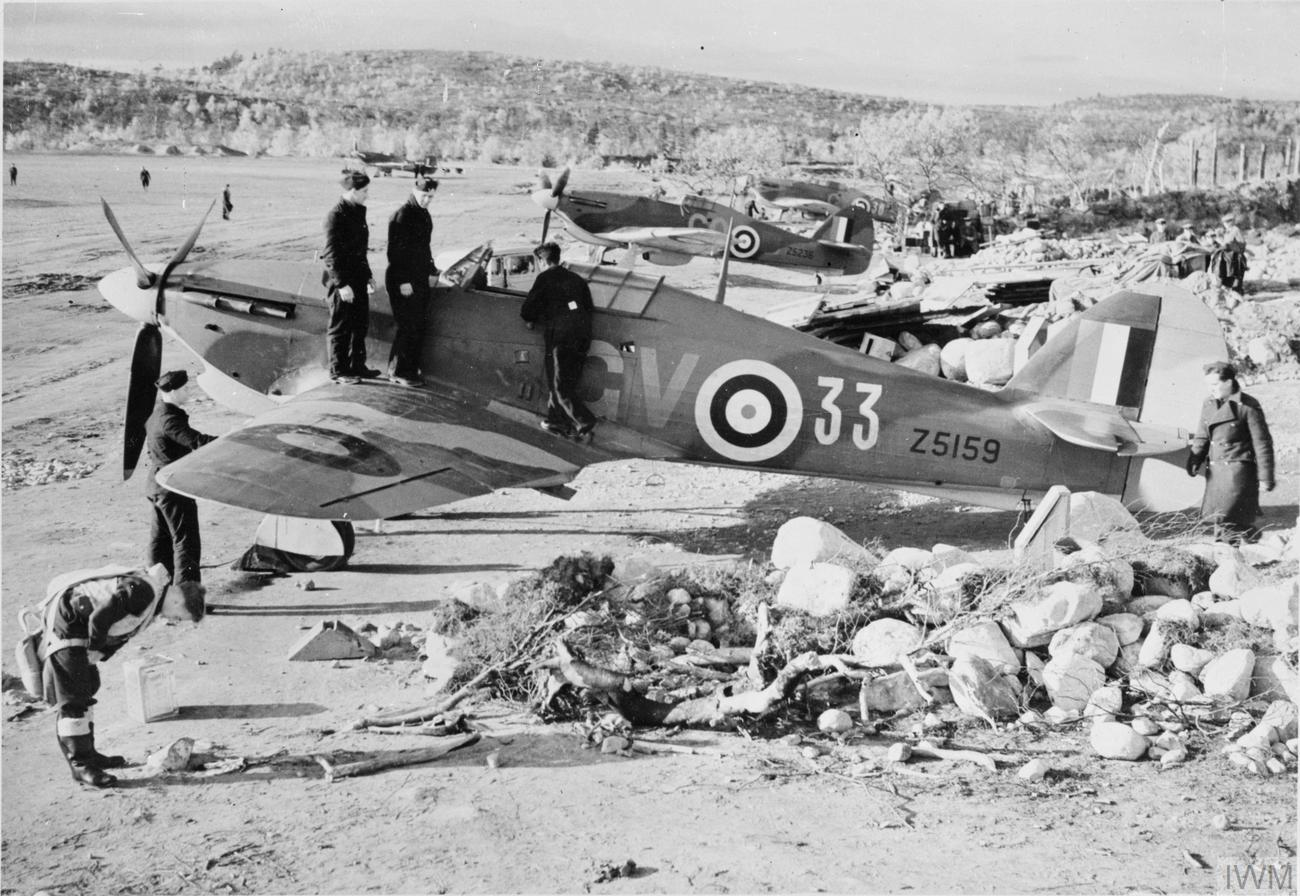
A Hawker Hurricane fighter of No. 134 Squadron at Vaenga airfield, near Murmansk, late 1941

The squadron reformed from a nucleus provided by 17 Squadron in July 1941 as a fighter unit equipped with Hawker Hurricanes stationed at RAF Leconfield. It was then based near Murmansk to train Russian pilots until the Hurricanes were handed over to the Russian Navy. Back in the UK the squadron was re-assembled at RAF Catterick on 7 December 1941, reequipped with Supermarine Spitfire fighters and moved to Northern Ireland for two months before it returned to RAF Baginton (in Warwickshire) to prepare to move overseas once again.

The squadron then operated in Egypt until November 1943 when it moved to India and Burma. It converted to the P-47 Thunderbolt and disbanded by being renumbered No. 131 Squadron.

== Aircraft operated ==
Aircraft operated by No. 134 Squadron RAF
From	To	Aircraft	Variant
Jun 1941	Mar 1942	Hawker Hurricane	IIB
Dec 1941	Feb 1942	Supermarine Spitfire	VA
Dec 1941	Feb 1942	Supermarine Spitfire	IIA
Jan 1942	Feb 1942	Hawker Hurricane	IIB
Jan 1942	Mar 1943	Supermarine Spitfire	VB
Jan 1943	Oct 1943	Hawker Hurricane	IIB
Mar 1943	Apr 1943	Hawker Hurricane	IIC
Jun 1943	Aug 1943	Supermarine Spitfire	VB & VC
Sep 1944	Jan 1945	Republic P-47 Thunderbolt	I
Sep 1944	Jan 1945	Republic P-47 Thunderbolt	II
