= Russian Naval Aviation =

Air arm of the Russian Navy

- Морская авиация Военно-морского флота Morskaya aviatsiya Voenno-morskogo flota
- Sleeve patch of the Russian Naval Aviation
- Active: 17 July [O.S. 4 July] 1916 – present
- Country: Russian Federation
- Branch: Russian Navy
- Type: Naval aviation
- Size: 28,000 personnel (2014); Approx. 359+ aircraft
- Engagements: World War I Winter War; Great Patriotic War; Soviet–Japanese War; Korean War; Cold War; Russian intervention in the Syrian civil war Russo-Ukrainian war

Commanders
- Current commander: Major-General Igor Kozhin
- Notable commanders: Major-General Timur Apakidze; Colonel-General Viktor Potapov

Insignia
- Ensign

- Roundel and fin flash (since 2010)

- Roundel and fin flash (until 2010)

- Middle emblem

The Russian Naval Aviation (Russian: Морская авиация Военно-морского флота России, romanized: Morskaya aviatsiya Voenno-morskogo flota Rossii, lit. 'Naval Aviation of the Russian Navy'; abbr. МА ВМФ России, MA VMF Rossii) (Note: Formerly known as the Russian Naval Air Force (Russian: Военно-воздушные силы Военно-морского флота России, until 1992), then as the Aviation of the Russian Navy (Russian: Авиация Военно-морского флота России, 1992–2002), and later as the Russian Naval Air and Air Defence Forces (Russian: Военно-воздушные силы и противовоздушная оборона Военно-морского флота России, 2002–2009).) is the naval aviation arm of the Russian Navy, a successor of Soviet Naval Aviation. The Russian Navy is divided into four fleets and one flotilla: the Northern, Pacific, Baltic, Black Sea Fleets, and the Caspian Flotilla.

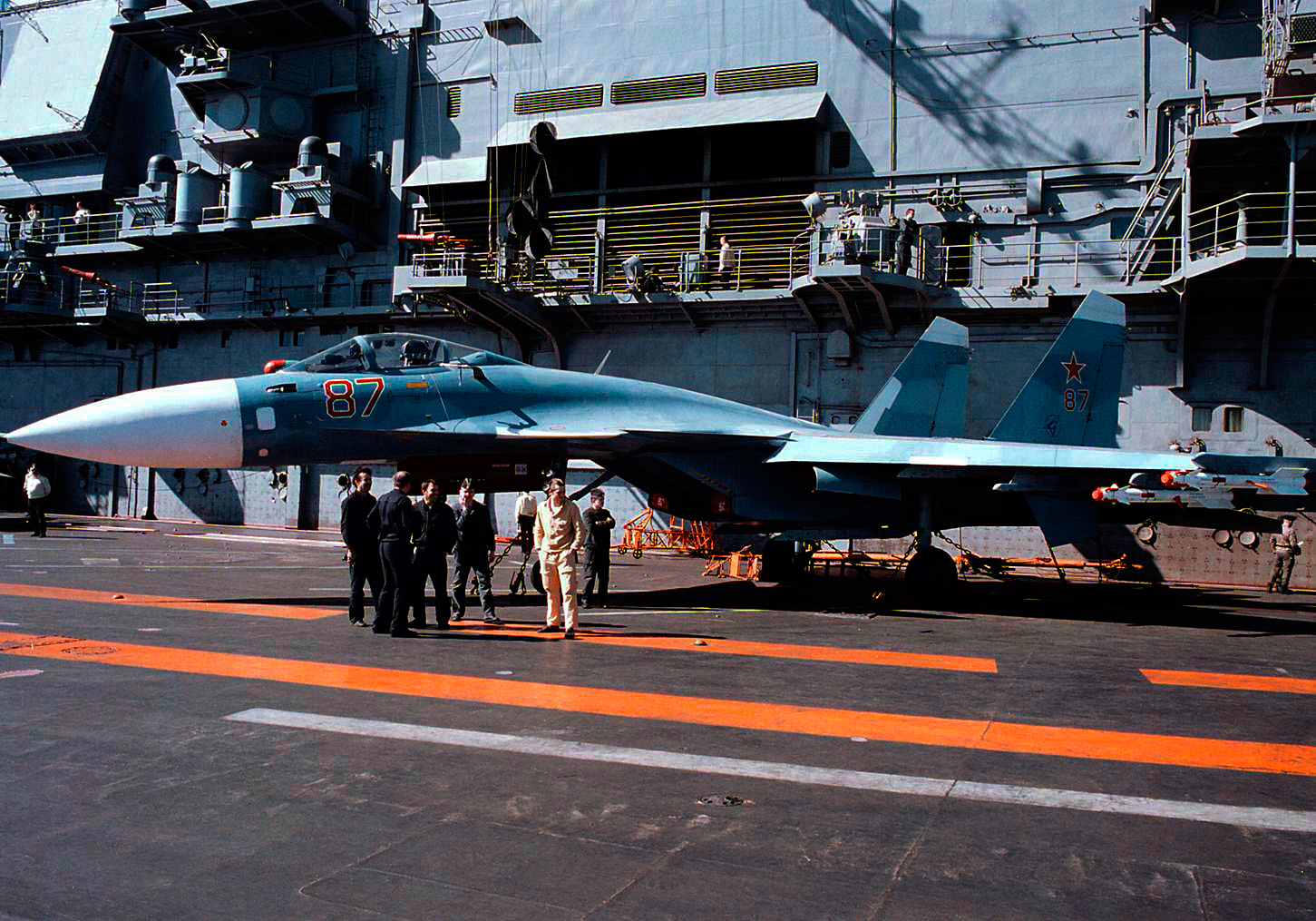
A Sukhoi Su-27K from the Northern Fleet Air Force 279th Separate Shipborne Fighter Aviation Regiment is on the Admiral Kuznetsov's flight deck, 1996

The air forces of the largest and most important fleets—the Northern and Pacific Fleets—operate Tu-142 long-range anti-submarine warfare (ASW) aircraft, Il-38 medium-range ASW aircraft, and Ka-27 shipborne ASW and search-and-rescue (SAR) helicopters. Formations operating Tu-22M3 supersonic bombers were transferred to the Russian Long Range Aviation in 2011. The relatively small fleets—the Baltic and Black Sea Fleets—currently have only Su-24 tactical bombers and ASW helicopters in service. Since the early 2000s, the small Caspian Flotilla has not had its own naval aviation units, so it currently uses airplanes and helicopters from the Russian Air Force and the Black Sea Fleet Naval Aviation.

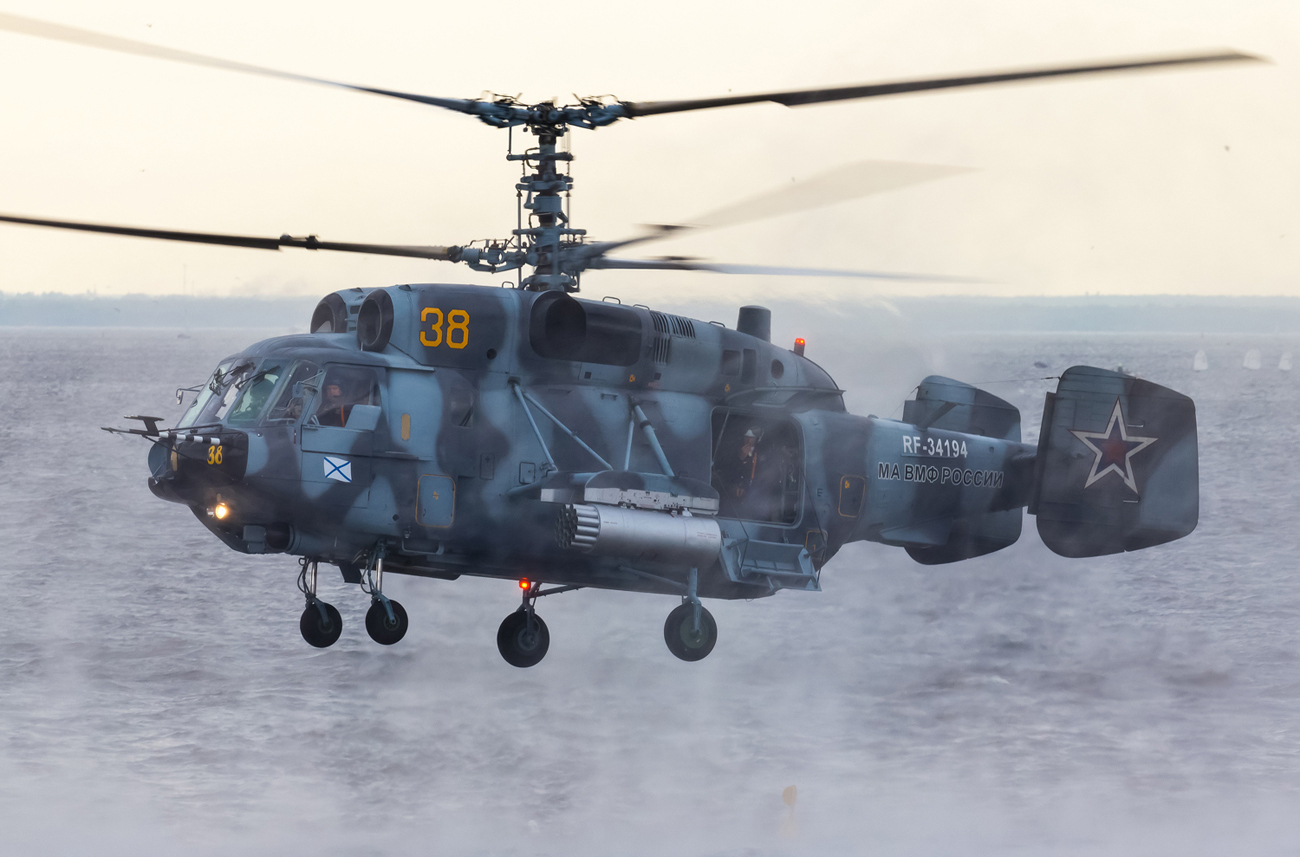
A Kamov Ka-29 utility helicopter from the Northern Fleet Naval Aviation 830th Separate Shipborne Anti-Submarine Helicopter Regiment, 2015

In 2011, the Russian Navy Deputy Commander-in-Chief for Naval Aviation and Air Defense/Commander, Naval Air and Air Defense Forces is Major General Igor Kozhin.

== History ==
=== Beginning ===
On 30 May 1912, the Vice-Admiral of the Imperial Russian Navy, Vice-Admiral Alexander Karl Nikolai von Lieven submitted a written report No. 127 on the plan for the creation of aviation detachments in the fleets . This document, approved with some reservations by the Naval Minister Vice Admiral Ivan Grigorovich, acquired the character of an order for the Naval Ministry. The logical continuation of the report was a letter from MGSh No. 1706/272 dated 06/02/1912 to the head of the General Staff School on the formation of the infrastructure of aviation units in 1913.

As of 1 January 1913, there was one seaplane and two wheeled airplanes on the Baltic Sea, and five seaplanes on the Black Sea. In the spring of 1914, by the decision of the Minister of the Navy, an aviation department was introduced into the staff of the Naval General Staff, consisting of three people.

=== World War I ===
The beginning of the World War I found the Russian Naval Aviation at the stage of organizational formation. In total, by 1 August 1914, the Naval Ministry had about three dozen aircraft of various types and about 20 certified pilots. About 10 more officers underwent flight training directly in the fleets. By the beginning of the war, there were only 10 seaplanes on the Baltic, based in Libau, and 8 seaplanes on the Black Sea, in Sevastopol, and Kilen Bay. It was planned to deploy air detachments on the Pacific Ocean only by the summer of 1915, but this was not implemented due to the outbreak of the war.

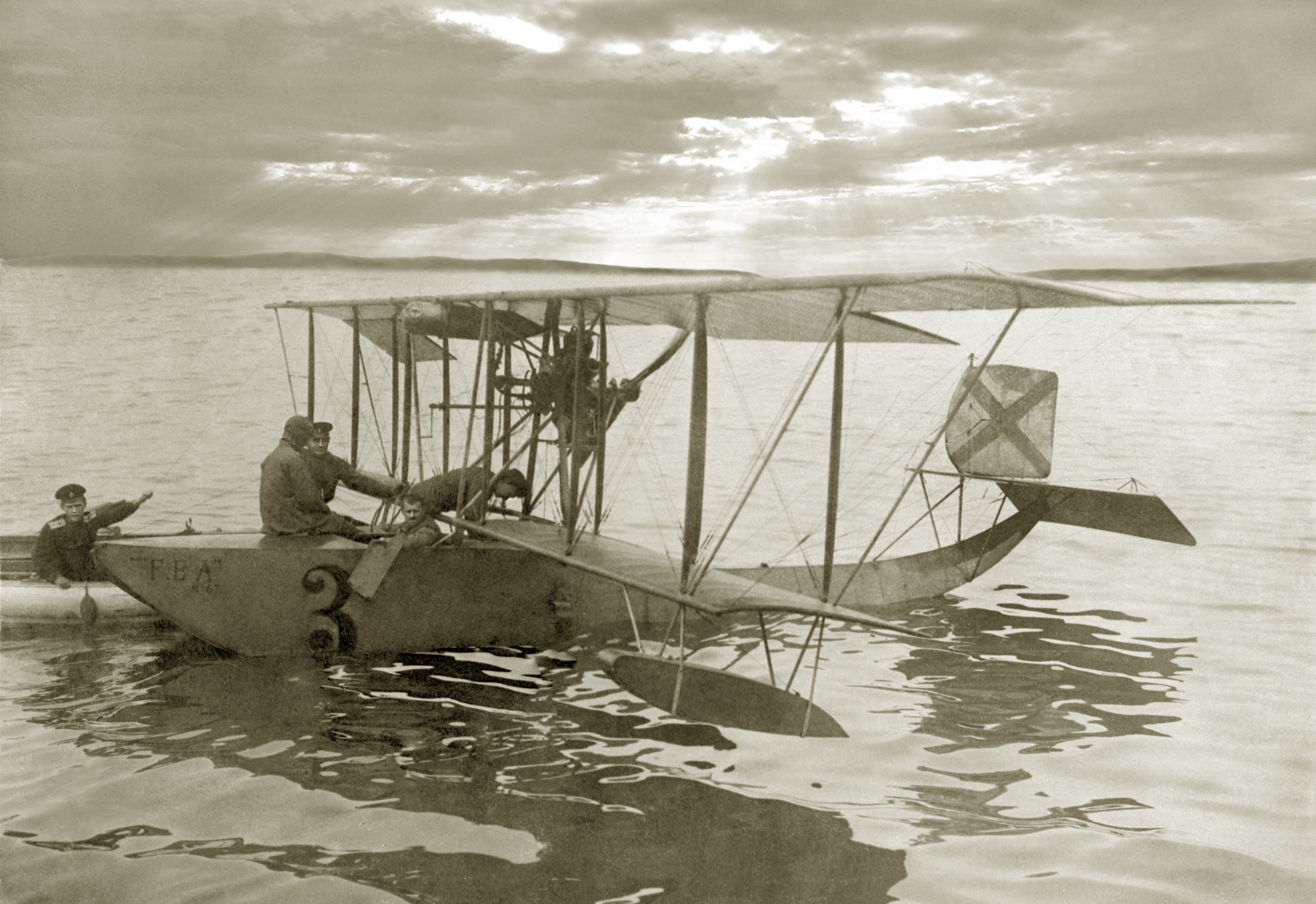
An FBA Type C flying boat from the Russian Naval Aviation Officer School in Baku, 1917

At the beginning of March 1915, the Naval Aviation already had 77 aircraft, including 47 on the Baltic, and 30 seaplanes on the Black Sea. They were served by 78 officers and 859 lower ranks. As of 1 January 1917, the Russian Naval Aviation was an impressive force and included 264 airplanes of various types. Of these, 152 aircraft and 4 small controlled balloons were in the Black Sea Fleet, 88 aircraft in the Baltic Fleet. Another 29 aircraft were available in the Petrograd and Baku naval aviation officer schools.

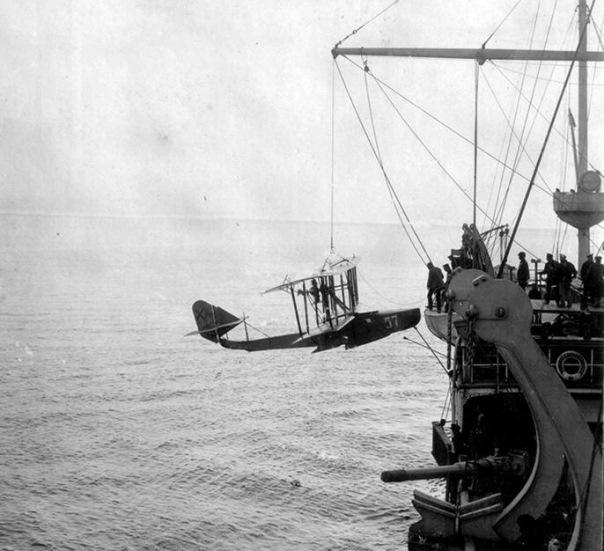
A Black Sea Fleet Naval Aviation Grigorovich M-5 flying boat being lifted aboard the Russian seaplane tender Almaz, 1916

From September 1916 to May 1917 alone, the Naval Department received 61 Grigorovich M-11 and M-12 seaplanes. 26 of them flew in the Black Sea Fleet, about 20 entered the Baltic Fleet. In the Black Sea and Baltic aviation units, respectively, 115 and 96 officers, 1,039 and 1,339 conductors, non-commissioned officers and privates served.

=== Russian Civil War and interwar period ===
The regular Soviet naval aviation units were created in 1918. They participated in the Russian Civil War, cooperating with the ships and the army during the combats at Petrograd, on the Baltic Sea, the Black Sea, the Volga, the Kama River, the Northern Dvina and on Lake Onega. The newborn Soviet Naval Aviation consisted of 76 obsolete hydroplanes. Scanty and technically imperfect, it was mostly used for resupplying the ships and the army.

In the second half of the 1920s, the Naval Aviation order of battle began to grow. It received new reconnaissance hydroplanes, bombers, and fighters. In the mid-1930s, the Soviets created naval air forces in the Baltic Fleet, the Black Sea Fleet, the Soviet Pacific Fleet, and the Soviet Northern Flotilla. The importance of naval aviation had grown significantly by 1938–1940, to become one of the main components of the Soviet Navy. By this time, the Soviets had created bomber and torpedo bomber naval air units and formations. At the beginning of the Great Patriotic War, all of the fleets (except for the Pacific Fleet) had a total of 1,445 aircraft.

=== World War II ===
At the end of June 1941, three air squadrons of the Civil Air Fleet (Baltic, Black Sea, Northern) were formed from civil aviation units (Baltic, Black Sea, Northern), which were operatively subordinate to the command of the air forces of the respective fleets. Their task was to provide transport services in the interests of the fleets. In addition, from the first days of the war, some aviation units of the NKVD Border Troops were transferred to the Naval Aviation. At the same time, the first assault aviation units appeared in the Soviet Naval Air Force: a squadron of the 57th BAP in the Baltic and the 46th OSHAE in the Black Sea Fleet.

In the Great Patriotic War, the Soviet Naval Air Force turned out to be the most effective of the forces of the fleet – the destruction of 407 enemy ships by aviation was officially confirmed, which is 66% of losses, with a total number of losses – 614 units (however, there is information that official data on the effectiveness of the work of mine and torpedo aviation, for a number of reasons, they are greatly overestimated).

In the end of World War II, a reduction in the Soviet Armed Forces began. In the Naval Aviation, after the end of hostilities, assault aviation was completely eliminated, however, three more aviation divisions were formed: the 17th SAD and the 18th SAD of the Pacific Fleet Air Force, as well as the 19th MTAD of the Navy's Main Command.

=== Cold War period ===
To attack surface ships at long ranges, the Soviet Navy was unique in deploying large numbers of bombers in a maritime role for use by Naval Aviation. The Kiev class of Soviet aircraft carriers was deployed in the late 1970s and carried up to 30 aircraft including Yak-38 VTOL strike aircraft. The next class of Soviet aircraft carriers, named the Kuznetsov class, supported more conventional aircraft such as the Su-27K "Flanker-D" and the MiG-29K "Fulcrum-D".

Land-based aircraft such as the Tupolev Tu-16 "Badger" and Tu-22M "Backfire" bombers were deployed with high-speed anti-ship missiles. Previously believed to be interceptors of NATO supply convoys traveling the sea lines of communication across the North Atlantic Ocean between Europe and North America, the primary role of these aircraft was to protect the Soviet mainland from attacks by U.S. carrier task forces.

=== Twenty-first century ===
Russian naval aviation participated in the Russian intervention in the Syrian civil war for a few months from November 2016 to January 2017 with the deployment of Russian aircraft carrier Admiral Kuznetsov to the Mediterranean. This deployment to Syria also marked the naval aviation's combat debut.

On 15 November 2016, Admiral Kuznetsov, took part in "a large-scale operation against the positions of terrorist groups Islamic State and Al-Nusra, in the provinces of Idlib and Homs" in Syria by launching Su-33 fighter strikes. Russian Defence Ministry later reported that at least 30 militants had been killed as a result of those strikes, including 3 field commanders, among them Abul Baha al-Asfari, leader of Al-Nusra reserves in the provinces of Homs and Aleppo. Al-Asfari had also planned and led several insurgent attacks on the city of Aleppo itself. The Su-33s reportedly used 500 kg (1,100 lb) precision bombs.

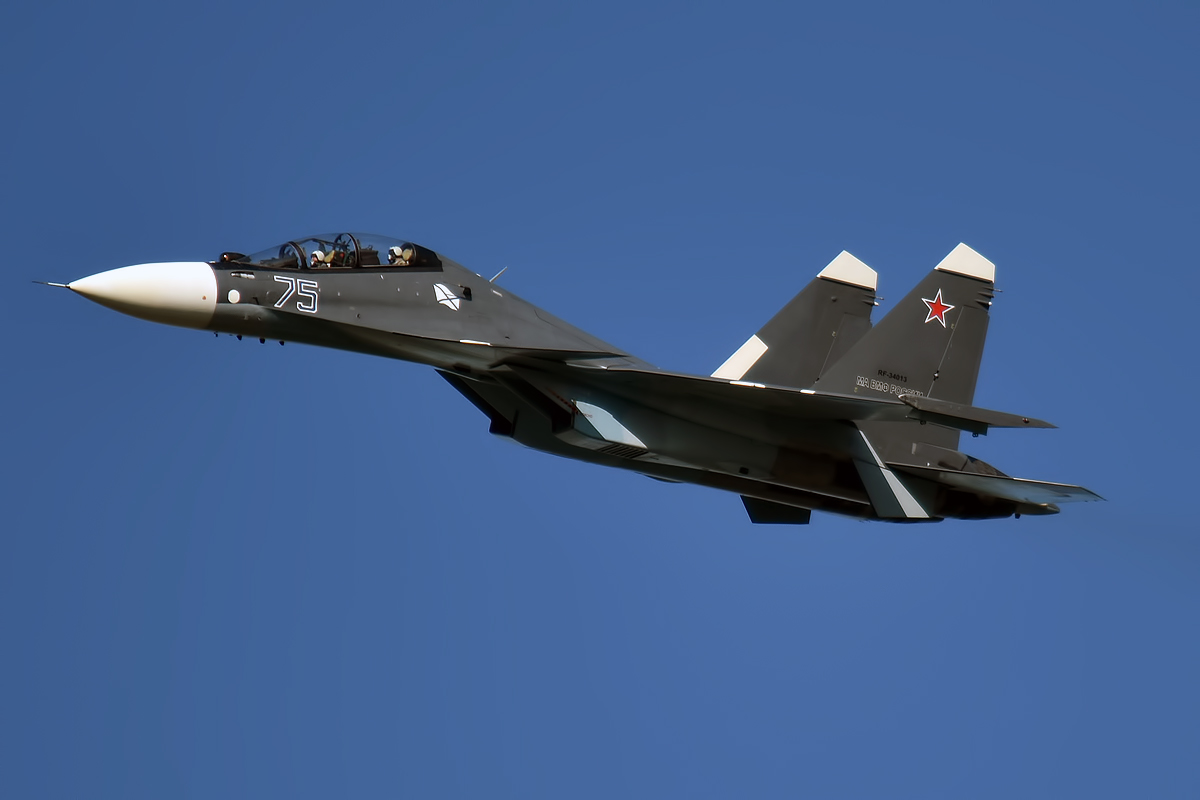
A Sukhoi Su-30SM is one of the most advanced combatants of the Russian Naval Aviation in 2019

On 3 December 2016, an Su-33 crashed into the sea after attempting to land on the Admiral Kuznetsov. The plane crashed on its second attempt to land on the aircraft carrier in good weather conditions. The pilot was safely recovered by a search and rescue helicopter. Initially it was suspected that the plane missed the wires and failed to go around, falling short of the bow of the warship, but later it was revealed that the arresting cable failed to hold the aircraft, and was damaged in the attempt. Following the two incidents, the air wing was transferred to shore at Khmeimim Air Base near Latakia, Syria to continue military operations while the carrier's arresting gear issues were addressed.

During her deployment off Syria, aircraft from Admiral Kuznetsov carried out 420 combat missions, hitting 1,252 hostile targets. On 11 January 2017, Admiral Kuznetsov was conducting live-fire training exercises in the Mediterranean off the coast of Libya. The Russian defence ministry announced that on 11 January, Admiral Kuznetsov was visited by Libya's military leader Khalifa Haftar, who had a video conference with Russian defence minister Sergey Shoygu while on board.

As of September 2024 the non-operational aircraft carrier Admiral Kuznetsov is the Russian Navy's only carrier leaving the Russian Navy without an operational aircraft carrier. Further, reports that the Admiral Kuznetsov's crew of ca. 1500 has been reassigned to the Russian Army for combat duty in Ukraine indicates that there is no plan to make the Russian Navy a carrier navy again.

=== Russo-Ukraine War, since 2022 ===
As of 2025, aircraft losses during the Russo-Ukraine War, for both the Russian Aerospace Forces and shore-based Russian naval aviation, have included at least seven Sukhoi Su-30SMs and between 10 and 20 of the older Su-24MRs. Russia's total inventory of approximately 110 Su-30s, and reserve stocks of at least 100 Su-24s, may allow for some of these losses to be absorbed but they have not been insignificant.

== Structure and Organisation ==
The 100th Shipborne Fighter Aviation Regiment (Military Unit Number 45782) was formed at Saki in the Crimea on 10 March 1986. In January 1992 its personnel refused to take the oath of loyalty to Ukraine, which would have presumably made them part of the Ukrainian Navy or Ukrainian Air Force, and instead its personnel left for Russia, leaving their aircraft and equipment behind. The unit regrouped at Severomorsk-3 as part of the Northern Fleet. However, in February 1993 the regiment was disbanded and its personnel and equipment incorporated into the 279th Shipborne Fighter Aviation Regiment.

The 279th Independent Shipborne Assault Aviation Regiment was established in 1973. In 1990 it became a Maritime Assault Aviation Regiment. On 22 February 1993 it was renamed the 279th Shipborne Fighter Aviation Regiment as it absorbed the remaining elements of the 100th Shipborne Fighter Aviation Regiment.

=== Structure in 2007 ===
This is the structure of the Russian Naval Aviation, as reproduced from the August 2007 issue of the Air Forces Monthly. Given the new data from 2015 to 2016 about the two shipborne fighter aviation regiments above, the 100th Shipborne Fighter Aviation Regiment, listed at Severomorsk-3 with the MiG-29K, has been removed from the Northern Fleet listing.

Naval High Command – Saint Petersburg

- 444th Center for Combat Application [Training] and Re-qualification of Flying Personnel of Naval Aviation – Ostrov
  - 240th Guards Composite (Instruction and Evaluation) Aviation Regiment – Ostrov - Tu-22M3, Tu-134UB-L/UB-K, Su-24M, L-39ZA, Tu-142, Il-38, Ilyushin Il-18, Be-12
- 46th Transport Aviation Regiment of the Navy – Ostafyevo (Moscow)
  - 1st Aviation Squadron – Ostafyevo (Moscow) - An-72
  - 2nd Aviation Squadron – Ostrov - Tu-154M, An-26

Northern Fleet Air Force – HQ Severomorsk

- 924th Guards Maritime Missile-Carrying Aviation Regiment (924-й ОГвМРАП) – HQ at Olenegorsk/Olenya - Tu-22M3;
- 279th Shipborne Fighter Aviation Regiment (279-й ОКИАП) – HQ at Severomorsk-3 - Su-33, Su-25UTG;
- 73rd ASW Long Range Aviation Squadron (73-я ОПЛАЭ ДД) – HQ at Kipelovo (Fedotovo) - Tu-142MK, Tu-142MR;
- 403rd Composite Aviation Regiment (403-й ОСАП) – HQ at Severomorsk-1 - Il-38, Tupolev Tu-134, An-12, An-26;
- 830th Red Banner Shipborne ASW Helicopter Regiment (830-й ОКПЛВП) - HQ at Severomorsk-1
  - 1st and 2nd Shipborne Helicopter Squadrons - Ka-27;
  - 3rd Assault Helicopter Squadron - Kamov Ka-29

Pacific Fleet Air Force – HQ Vladivostok

- 568th Guards Composite Aviation Regiment (568-й ОГвСАП) – HQ at Mongokhto
  - 1st and 2nd Missile-Carrying Aviation Squadrons - Tu-22M3;
  - 3rd ASW Long Range Aviation Squadron - Tu-142MR/MZ;
  - SAR Detachment - An-12PS;
- 865th Fighter Aviation Regiment (865-й ОИАП) – HQ at Yelizovo-Petropavlovsk-Kamchatsky Airport - MiG-31;
- 317th Composite Air Regiment (317-й ОСАП) – HQ at Yelizovo - Tu-142;
  - 175th Shipborne ASW Helicopter Squadron (175-я ОПЛВЭ) – HQ at Yelizovo - Ka-27;
- 71st Transport Aviation Squadron (71-я ОТРАЭ) – HQ at Vladivostok-Kievichi Airport - An-12, Tu-134, An-24, An-26;
- 289th ASW Aviation Regiment (289-й ОСПЛАП) – HQ at Nikolayevka - Il-38, Ka-27, Ka-29;

Baltic Fleet Air Force – HQ Kaliningrad

- 689th Fighter Aviation Regiment (689-й ОГвИАП) – Kaliningrad Chkalovsk - operating Su-27;
- 4th Naval Attack Aviation Regiment (4-й ОГвМШАП) – Chernyakhovsk Air Base - operating Su-24M/MR;
- 125th Helicopter Squadron (125-я ОВЭ) – HQ at Chkalovsk - operating Mi-8, Mi-24;
- 396th Shipborne ASW Helicopter Squadron (396-я ОКПЛВЭ) - Donskoye Air Base - Ka-27/PS, Ka-29;
- 398th Transport Aviation Squadron (398-я ОТРАЭ) – HQ at Khrabrovo - An-2, An-12, An-24, An-26, Be-12, Mi-8.

Black Sea Fleet Air Arm – HQ Sevastopol (status in 2010)

- 25th ASW Helicopter Regiment (25-й ОКПЛВП) - HQ at Kacha, Crimea - ~20 helicopters of types Ka-27 and Mi-14
- 917th Composite Aviation Regiment (917-й ОСАП) - HQ at Kacha, Crimea - ~10x Antonov transport aircraft of types An-12, An-26, An-2, 4x Be-12; ~10x Mi-8
- 43rd Naval Attack Aviation Regiment (43-й ОМШАП) - HQ at Gvardeyskoe, Crimea - 18x Su-24M; 4x Su-24MR; the Crimean Saki Naval Airfield portion of the regiment was decimated in a Ukrainian attack in August 2022

=== Structure after 2008–2011 reforms ===
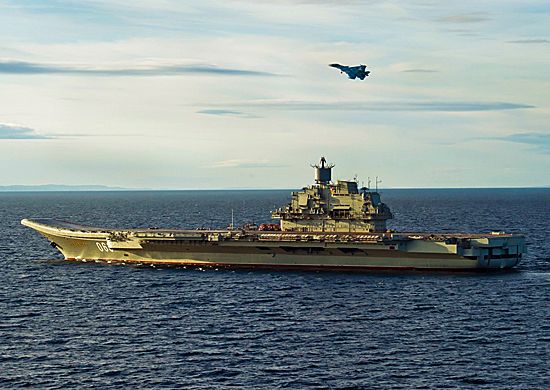
A Su-33 aircraft passing the Admiral Kuznetsov aircraft carrier, 2011

As a result of the 2008 Russian military reforms, the units of the Russian Naval Aviation were reorganized into 13 new Naval Air Bases. Each new naval air base consists of an HQ, support units and one or more aviation groups/wings (the former air bases). In a second stage, the air bases were merged into territorially integrated structures. Only the 279th Regiment retained its status. The planned transfer of Naval Aviation assets (Su-24, Su-27, Tu-22M3, MiG-31) to the Air Force has been delayed due to their importance to the service, but was finally implemented by the end of 2011.

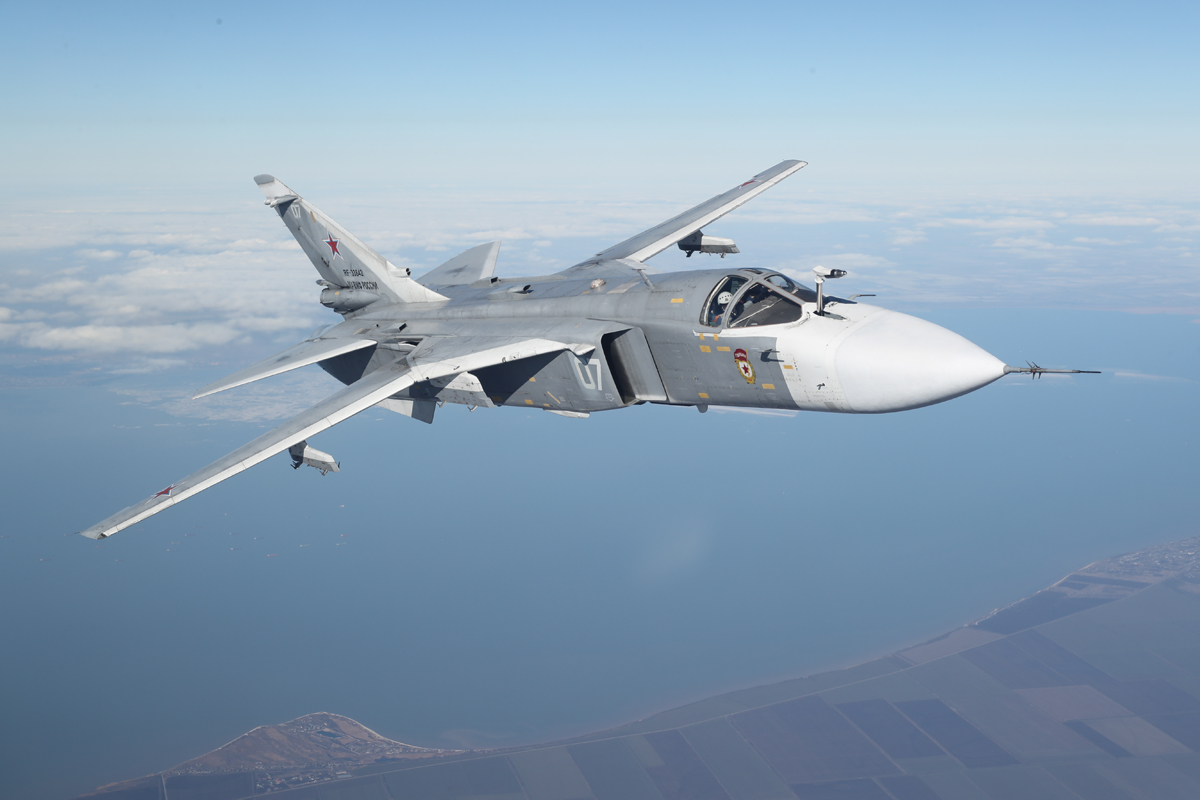
A Sukhoi Su-24M tactical bomber from the Black Sea Fleet Naval Aviation 43rd Separate Assault Aviation Regiment, 2018

As of 2012, the only fixed wing strike and fighter aircraft of Russian Naval Aviation are the Su-33 fighters and Su-25UTG attack aircraft of the 279th Regiment (forming the Admiral Kuznetsov carrier's air wing), plus the Su-24 bombers based in the Crimea. This sole bomber unit remained part of Naval Aviation as an exception to satisfy treaty requirements governing Russian forces deployments on Ukrainian territory (these must be part of the Black Sea Fleet). Buying brand new multirole Sukhoi Su-30SM for the Black Sea Fleet to replace Su-24 was in the planning stages and it has been completed as of December 2016. Naval aviation also retains the anti-submarine aircraft of the forces (the Tu-142 and the Il-38) and the helicopter arm.

Given the new data from 2015 to 2016 from Russian sources regarding the 100th Shipborne Fighter Aviation Regiment's disbandment in 1993, Air Force's Monthly's listing of both the 100th and 279th Regiments at the Severomorsk-3 NAB has been altered by removal of the 100 KIAP.

Naval air bases of the Russian Naval Aviation include:

Baltic Fleet air bases – HQ at Kaliningrad:

- Donskoe NAB
- Chernyakhovsk NAB
- Chkalovsk NAB
- Khabrovo NAB

Black Sea Fleet air bases – HQ at Sevastopol:

- Gvardiyskoye NAB
- Kacha NAB
- Novofedorivka NAB
- Saki
  - 43rd Independent Naval Attack Aviation Regiment (43rd OMShAP) (formerly at Gvardeiskoye) (Su-30SM, Su-24M/MR)

Northern Fleet air bases – HQ at Severomorsk:

- Kipelovo NAB
- Olenegorsk NAB
- Severomorsk-1 NAB
- Severomorsk-2 NAB
- Severomorsk-3 NAB
  - 279th Independent Shipborne Fighter Aviation Regiment (279th OKIAP)
- Monchegorsk NAB
  - 98th Composite Aviation Regiment (98th SAP)

Pacific Fleet air bases – HQ at Vladivostok:

- Chkalovsk NAB
  - 72nd Guards Air Base
- Elizovo NAB/Yelizovo (Petropavlovsk-Kamchatsky Airport)
  - 7060th Air Base
- Kamennyy Ruchey NAB
- Nikolaev NAB

=== Organization ===
The Soviet and its successor the Russian Naval Aviation follow the TOE of the Soviet (Russian Air Force respectively). This practice was formally established with Order No. 0036 of the Navy Chief-of-Staff (issued on 7 October and implemented on 15 December 1947). Therefore, it followed air force unit convention (air army (air corps) - aviation division - aviation regiment) and its personnel held air force type ranks (generals, colonels, majors etc.).

A major divergence from the practice in the NATO member states and the countries, which follow US air force traditions is that the Soviet Union, its Warsaw Pact and other Socialist allies (such as Vietnam, North Korea, Cuba etc.) kept flying units and the ground support units separate (radar, signals, engineer units) subordinated separately to higher command and control level. For example, an aviation regiment and the radar and signals battalion, the air field battalion and the other support units servicing the air field reported to their air division.

Another difference is that Soviet military air arms did not bring aviation units of different branches (fighter, transport, helicopter) together. The only exceptions were Mixed Aviation Regiments, (which performed liaison and transport tasks for armies, military districts etc. and had a fleet of An-24/ An-26 planes and Mi-8/ Mi-9 helicopters) or rarely air regiments, which flew one single type in different variants and tasks (for example a Tu-22 naval missile-carrying aviation regiment flying 1-2 missile-carrying aviation squadrons and a squadron of reconnaissance or EW variants).

The 2008 Russian military reform planned during the term of Anatoly Serdyukov changed that. The main organizational change in the Ground Forces was the transition from a 4-level operational chain of command (Military District – Army – Division – Regiment) to a 3-level one (Military District – Operational Command (Army) – Brigade). The Air Force transitioned correspondingly to Military District – Operational Command – Air Base chain of command.

The air bases combined geographically closely located flying units of various arms with ground support units. As the naval aviation followed the air force organizational practice it too adopted the air base organization. The separate air commands of the fleets (Air Force of the Northern Fleet, Air Force of the Pacific Fleet, Air Force of the Baltic Fleet and Air Force of the Black Sea Fleet) were disbanded and naval aviation assets adopted a three level operational chain of command including Military District – Fleet – Air Base.

Concerning its inventory, it was decided that the naval aviation divest its heavy bombers and fighter aircraft (except for the Admiral Kuznetsov's air wing), transferring them to the Air Force. The re-organization of the Air Force was later reverted on the grounds of being counter-productive. The four Air Forces and Air Defence Operational Commands (1st through 4th) were reverted to Air Forces and Air Defence Armies (6th, 14th, 11th and 4th respectively), one per military district each.

With the establishment of the Northern Fleet Joint Strategic Command as a de facto fifth military district a new 45th Air Forces and Air Defence Army was formed under it. Its aviation units belong to the naval aviation unlike the other four air armies, which consist of air force units. The air force also started transforming its fighter aviation from air bases into fighter aviation regiments belonging to composite aviation divisions.

The naval aviation also reverted the decision to divest its fighter air arm (but not its bomber aircraft, which remain with the Air Force). MiG-31 were transferred back to the Navy and new Su-30SM heavy multirole fighters were ordered. These aircraft were grouped into fighter aviation regiments independent from the air bases. As of 2019 the naval aviation air bases consist of maritime patrol and ASW aircraft, transport aircraft, ASW helicopters, combat and assault helicopters, transport helicopters and UAVs.

Naval aviation is following the air force in the resurrection of the air divisions as an operational level of command and control. It is yet undecided whether the naval aviation air bases will become air divisions, reforming their fixed wing, helicopter and UAV assets in aviation regiments and squadrons or new composite naval aviation divisions will be formed and the NAABs will be subordinated to them next to the fighter aviation regiments.

=== Naval aviation in 2019 ===
==== Naval High Command ====
Naval High Command – Saint Petersburg

- Units directly subordinated to the NHC
  - Naval Aviation Central Signals Node (Центральный узел связи морской авиации ВМФ) (Domodedovo (Moscow))
  - Naval Aviation Training Center (Учебный центр морской авиации ВМФ) (Severomorsk-1) - basic theoretic training for naval aviators
  - 859th Center for Naval Aviation Combat Application [Training] and Re-qualification of Flying Personnel (859-й Центр боевого применения и переучивания летного состава морской авиации) (Yeysk Airfield) - Su-33, Su-30SM, MiG-29K/KUB, Su-25UTG, L-39ZA, Il-38N, Il-20, An-140-100, An-26, Ka-27PL, Ka-28, Ka-29
  - SAR Navy Support Aviation Squadron (Авиационная эскадрилья поисково-спасательного обеспечения ВМФ РФ) (Ostafyevo (Shcherbinka) Airfield): An-12PS, An-26, An-72, An-140-100.

==== Northern Fleet Naval Aviation ====
The Northern Fleet was subordinated to the Western Military District, but with the re-vitalization of Russia's interests in the High Arctic it was decided to make it part of the core of a new, fifth, military district - the Northern Fleet Joint Strategic Command.

Northern Fleet Joint Strategic Command – Severomorsk

- Red Banner Northern Fleet Naval Aviation – Severomorsk
  - The naval aviation assets of the Northern Fleet were used as the core for the formation of the 45th Air and Air Defence Forces Army in 2015
- 45th Air and Air Defence Forces Army – Severomorsk
  - 100th Shipborne Fighter Aviation Regiment (100-й Отдельный корабельный истребительный авиационный полк (100-й ОКИАП)) (Severomorsk-3, Yeysk) - 2x sqns of MiG-29K/KUB
  - 279th Shipborne Fighter Aviation Regiment "Twice Hero of the Soviet Union Boris Safonov" (279-й Отдельный корабельный истребительный авиационный полк имени дважды Героя Советского Союза Б. Ф. Сафонова (279-й ОКИАП)) (Severomorsk-3) - 2x sqns of Sukhoi Su-33, 1x sqn of Sukhoi Su-25UTG, 1x shorebased Sukhoi Su-30SM to be formed
  - 174th Pechenga Guards Red Banner Fighter Aviation Regiment "Twice Hero of the Soviet Union Boris Safonov" (174-й Отдельный гвардейский истребительный Печенгский Краснознаменный авиационный полк им. Б.Ф. Сафонова (174-й ОГвИАП)) (Monchegorsk Airfield) - MiG-31BM (disbanded on Sept 1, 2001, re-formed in 2019, splitting from 98th Composite Aviation Regiment)
  - 98th Wisla Guards Red Banner Order of Kutuzov Composite Aviation Regiment (98-й Отдельный гвардейский смешанный авиационный Висленский Краснознамённый, ордена Кутузова полк (98-й ОГвСАП)) (Monchegorsk Airfield) - Su-24M/MR, Mi-24
  - 403rd Composite Aviation Regiment (403-й ОСАП) – Severomorsk-1 - Il-38N, Il-18, Il-20, Il-22 Tupolev Tu-134, An-12, An-26, Tu-134
  - 830th Red Banner Shipborne ASW Helicopter Regiment (830-й ОКПЛВП) – Severomorsk-1 – Ka-27, Ka-29, Ka-31
  - 7050th Kirkenes Red Banner Aviation Base (7050-я авиационная Киркенесская Краснознамённая база (7050-я АвБ МА)) (Severomorsk-1)
    - 2nd Air Group (2-я Aвиагруппа 7050-й авиабазы (2-я АГ/ 7050-й АвБ)) (Fedotovo (Kipelovo) Airfield) - Tu-142MR/MK
    - 3rd Air Group (3-я Aвиагруппа 7050-й авиабазы (3-я АГ/ 7050-й АвБ)) (Ostafyevo (Shcherbinka) Airfield) - An-12, An-24, An-26, An-72, An-140-100

==== Pacific Fleet Naval Aviation ====
Order of Lenin, Twice [awarded the] Red Banner and Order of Suvorov Eastern Military District – Khabarovsk

- Red Banner Pacific Fleet Naval Aviation – Vladivostok
  - Red Banner Northeastern Group of Troops and Forces (Войска и силы на Северо-востоке) – Petropavlovsk-Kamchatsky
    - 865th Order of Labour Red Banner Fighter Aviation Regiment (865-й Отдельный истребительный авиационный ордена Трудового Красного Знамени полк (865-й ОИАП)) (Yelizovo (Petropavlovsk-Kamchatsky IAP)) - MiG-31BM, Su-35 (Deployed support from the Russian Air Force, but not affiliated with the Russian Naval Aviation)
    - 317th Composite Aviation Regiment (317-й Отдельный смешанный авиаполк (317-й ОСАП)) (Yelizovo (Petropavlovsk-Kamchatsky IAP)) - Il-38N, Il-22
    - 175th Shipborne ASW Helicopter Squadron (175-я Отдельная корабельная противолодочная вертолётная эскадрилья (175-я ОКПЛВЭ)) (Yelizovo (Petropavlovsk-Kamchatsky IAP)) - Ка-27
    - UAV Detachment (Отряд БПЛА) (Ugolny (Anadyr) Airfield) - Forpost, Orlan-10
  - Primorsky Combined Forces Flotilla (Приморская флотилия разнородных сил Тихоокеанского флота) – Fokino
    - 7062nd Port Artur Red Banner Naval Aviation Air Base (7062-я Порт-Артурская Краснознаменная авиационная база морской авиации (7062-я АвБ МА)) (Nikolayevka Primorskya (Zolotaya Dolina) Air Field) - Il-38N, Il-22, Ka-27PL/PS, Mi-8
      - Anti-Submarine Aviation Squadron (Отдельная противолодочная авиаэскадрилья (ОПЛАЭ)) (Mongohto (Sovetskaya Gavan/ Kamenny Ruchey) Air Field) - Tu-142M/MZ/MR
      - Transport Aviation Squadron (Отдельная транспортная авиаэскадрилья (ОТРАЭ)) (Artyom (Vladivostok–Knevichi IAP) Airfield) - An-12PP(EW) / PS(SAR), An-26

==== Baltic Fleet Naval Aviation ====
Order of Lenin Leningrad Military District – Saint Petersburg

- Twice Red Banner Baltic Fleet Naval Aviation – Kaliningrad
  - 132nd Mixed Aviation Division (Naval Aviation)
    - Division HQ
    - 4th Novgorod-Klaipėda Guards Red Banner Maritime Attack Aviation Regiment "Aviation Marshal Ivan Borzov" (4-й Отдельный гвардейский морской штурмовой Новгородско-Клайпедский Краснознаменный авиационный полк имени маршала авиации Ивана Борзова) (Chernyakhovsk Air Field) - Su-30SM, Su-24M
    - 689th Independent Sandomirskiy, Order of Alexander Nevsky Guards Fighter Aviation Regiment "Aviation Marshal Alexander Pokryshkin"(689-й Отдельный гвардейский истребительный Сандомирский ордена Александра Невского авиационный полк имени маршала авиации А.И. Покрышкина (689-й ОГвИАП)) (Chkalovsk Air Field) - Sukhoi Su-27SM/UB, to convert to Su-35S some time after 2020.
    - 72nd Novgorod-Klaipėda Guards Red Banner "Aviation Marshal Ivan Borzov" Aviation Base (72-я гвардейская авиационная Новгородско-Клайпедская Краснознамённая имени маршала авиации И.И. Борзова база (72-я ГвАвБ МА)) (Chernyakhovsk Air Field)
      - (Former 398th) Independent Transport Aviation Squadron (398-я Отдельная транспортная авиационная эскадрилья (398-я ОТРАЭ)) (Khrabrovo Airport) - An-140-100, An-24, An-26
      - (Former 396th) Shipborne ASW Helicopter Squadron (396-я Отдельная корабельная противолодочная вертолётная эскадрилья (396-я ОКПЛВЭ)) (Donskoye Air Field) - Ka-27PL/PS, Ka-29
      - (Former 125th) Independent Helicopter Squadron (125-я Отдельная вертолётная эскадрилья (125-я ОВЭ)) (Chkalovsk Air Field) - Mi-24, Mi-8
  - The former German hydroplane air station in Baltiysk on the Vistula Spit, which was used by the Baltic Fleet's Beriev amphibious planes until its abandonment in 1995 will be reconstructed to field a naval squadron of Beriev Be-200s.

==== Black Sea Fleet Naval Aviation ====
Red Banner and Order of Suvorov Southern Military District – Rostov-on-Don

- Red Banner Black Sea Fleet Naval Aviation – Sevastopol
  - 2nd Guards Naval Aviation Division
    - Division HQ
    - 43rd Maritime Attack Aviation Regiment (43-й Отдельный морской штурмовой авиационный полк (43-й ОМШАП)) (Saky Air Base) - Su-30SM, Su-24M/MR
    - 318th Composite Aviation Regiment (318-й отдельный смешанный авиационный полк (318-й ОСАП)) (Kacha Air Base) - Tu-134UB-L, An-12, An-26, An-2, Ka-27, Ka-29, Mi-8
    - UAV Squadron (Khersones (air base)) Orlan-10 and Forpost
- Red Banner Caspian Flotilla – Astrakhan
  - The Caspian Flotilla does not field organic aviation assets

== Equipment ==
The Russian Naval Aviation maintains a large and varied fleet of fixed-wing and rotary aircraft, the most numerous of which is the Kamov Ka-27 anti-submarine helicopter that operates from various surface ships.

== Gallery ==
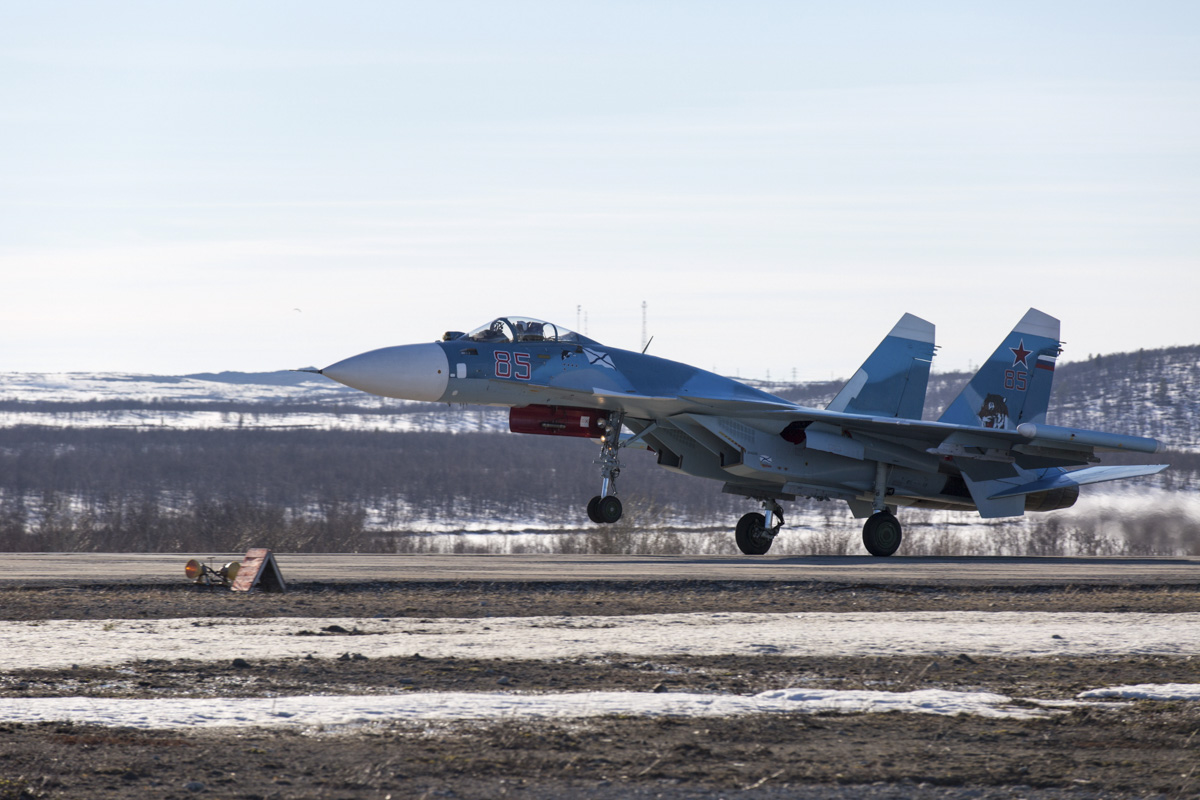
A Northern Fleet Naval Aviation Sukhoi Su-33 fighter taking off from Severomorsk-3, 2017

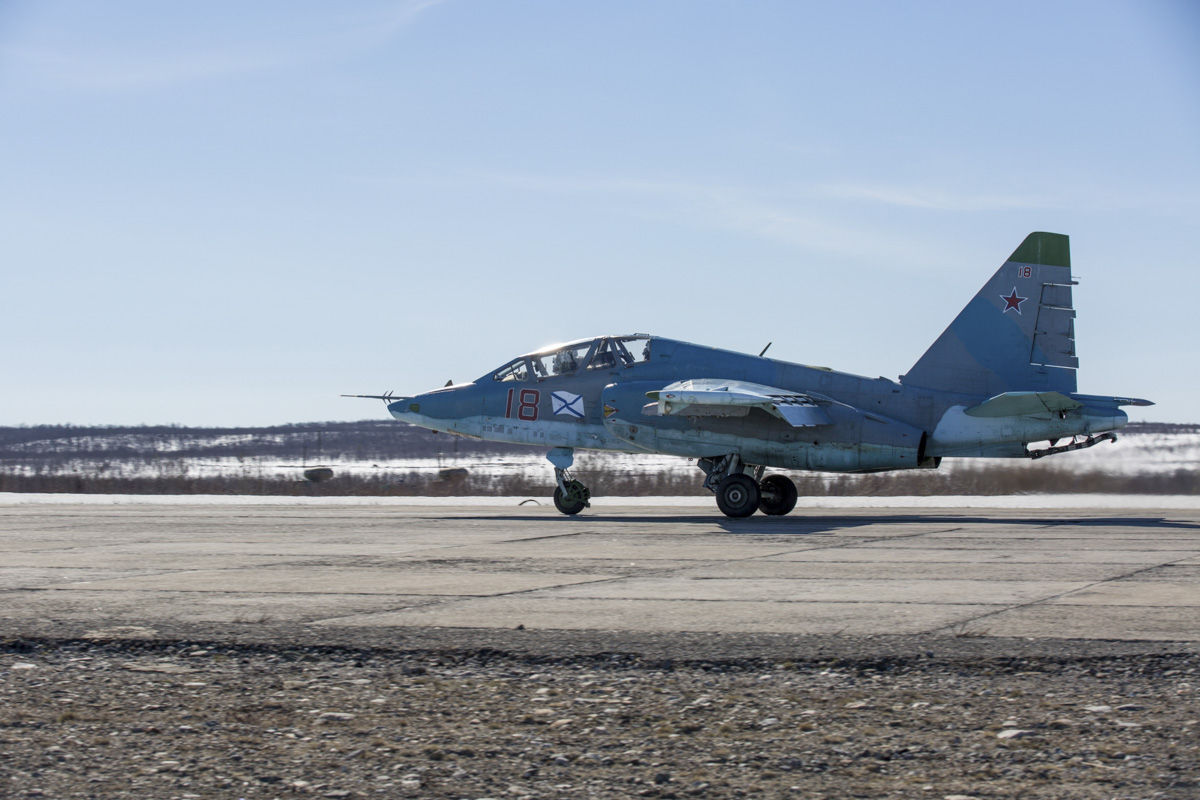
A Northern Fleet Naval Aviation Sukhoi Su-25UTG trainer is at Severomorsk-3, 2017

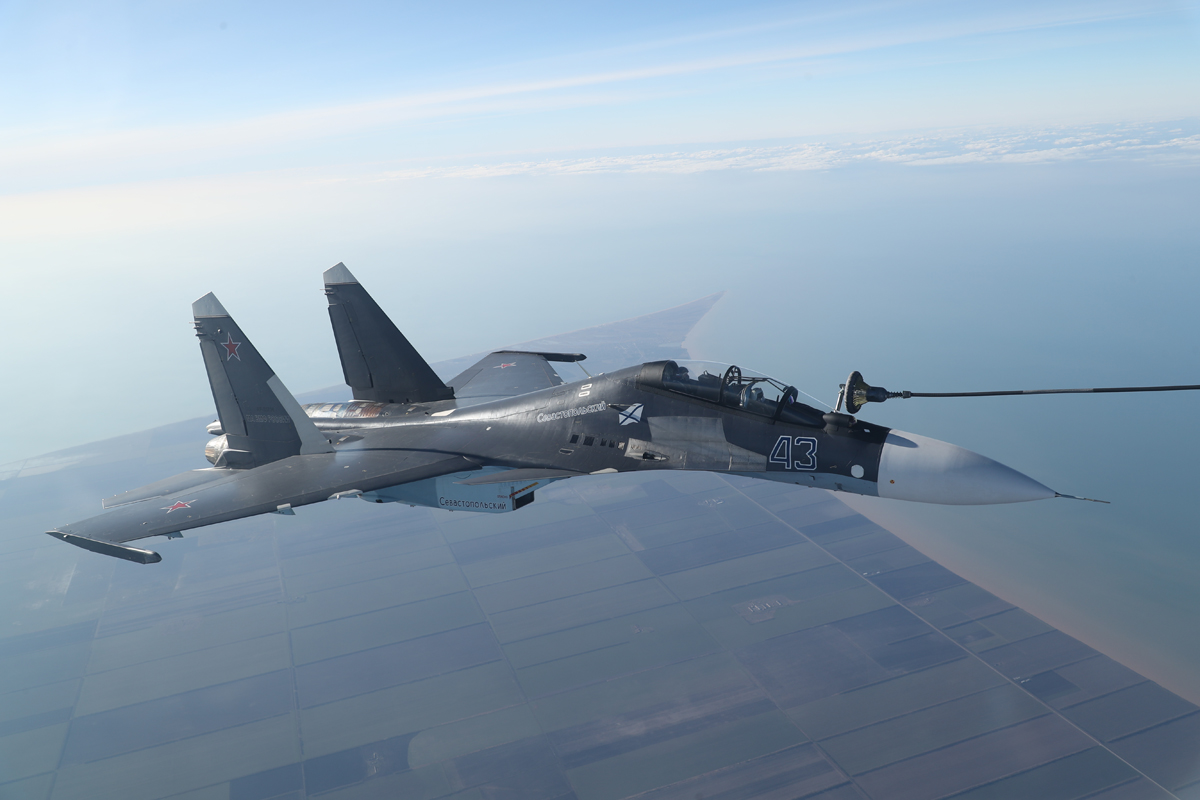
A Black Sea Fleet Naval Aviation Sukhoi Su-30SM multirole fighter conducted an aerial refueling activity, 2018

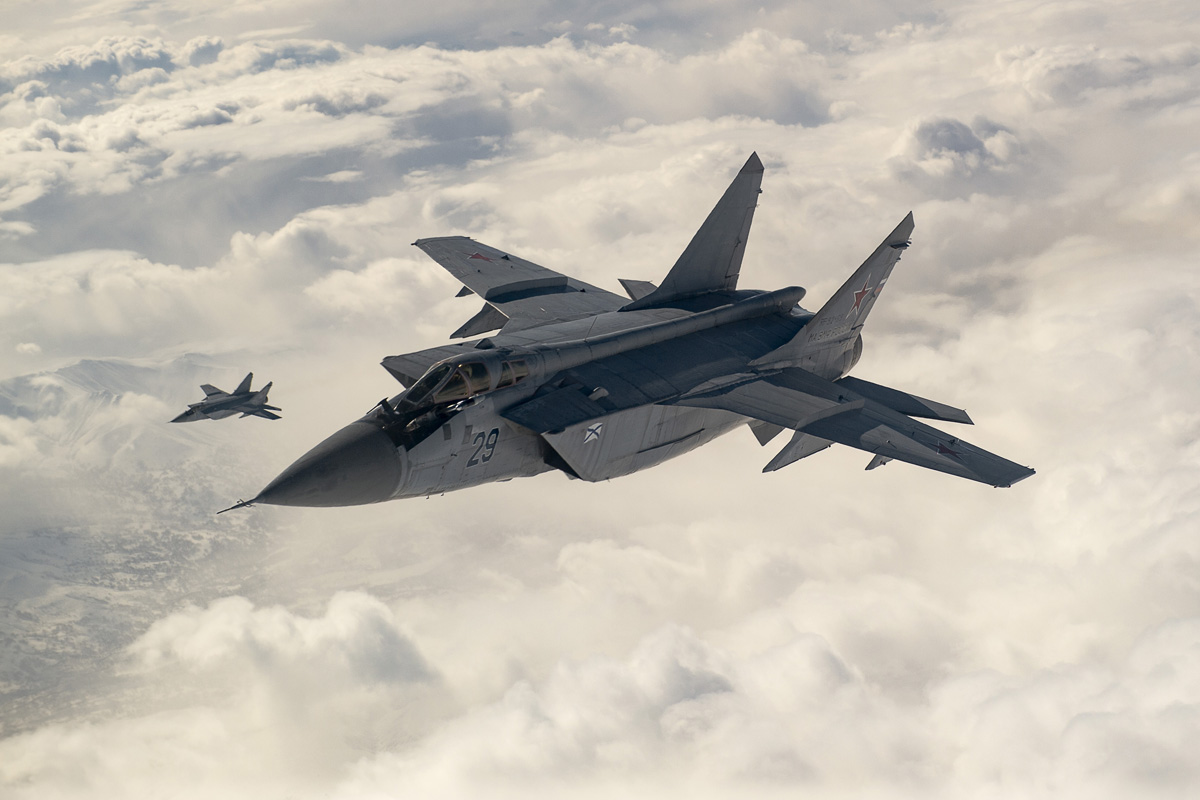
Pacific Fleet Naval Aviation Mikoyan MiG-31DZ interceptors flying over the Kamchatka Peninsula, 2018

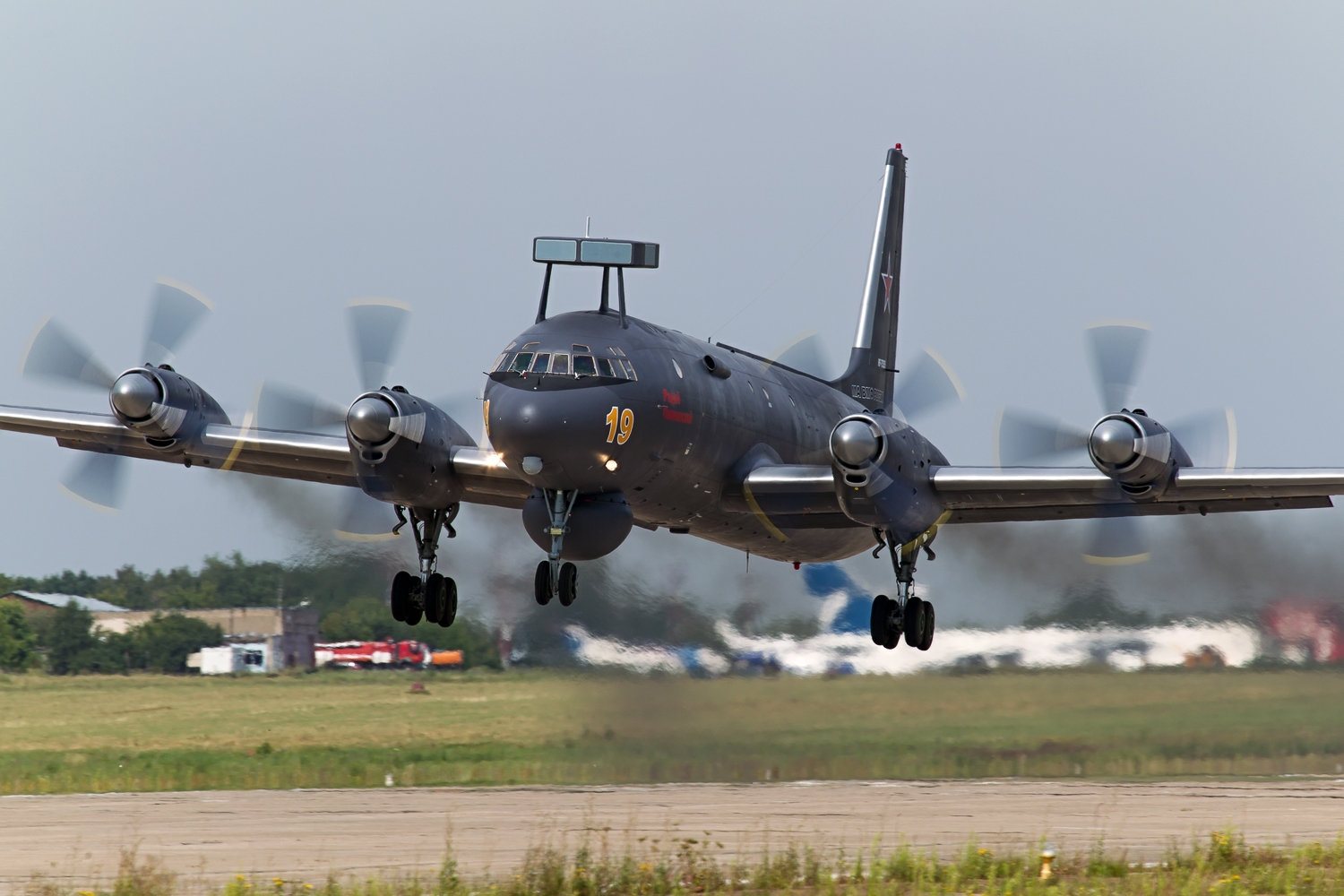
A Russian Naval Aviation Ilyushin Il-38N maritime reconnaissance aircraft taking off from Zhukovsky, 2014

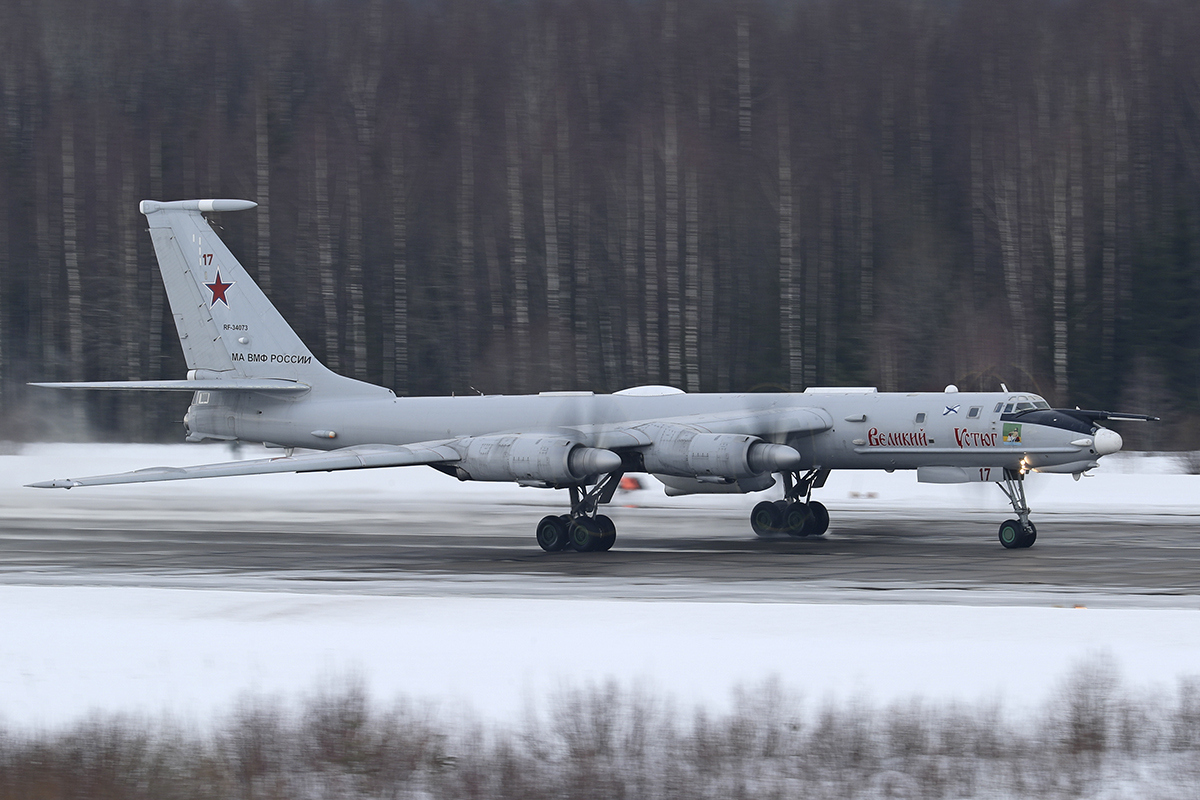
The Northern Fleet Naval Aviation Tupolev Tu-142MR Veliky Ustyug maritime patrol aircraft is at Kipelovo, 2019

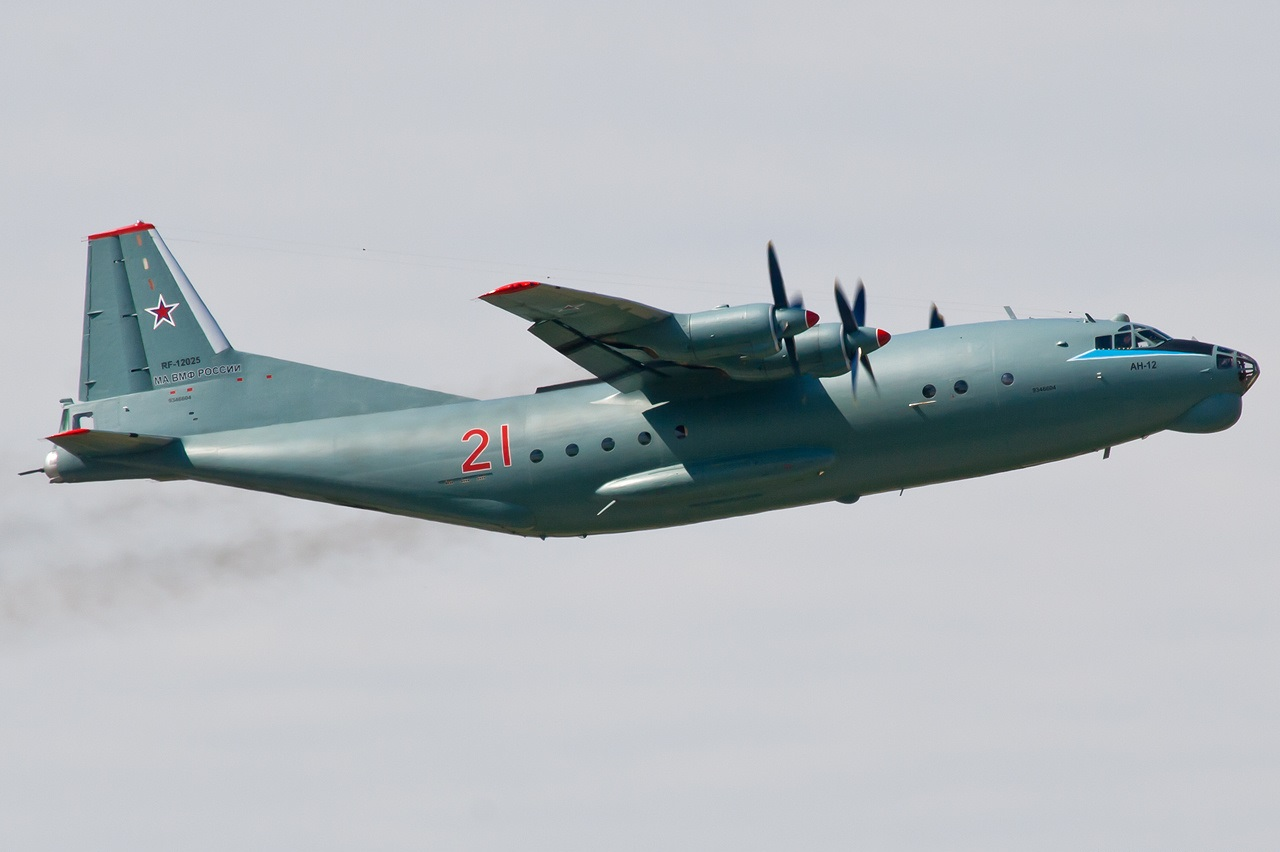
A Pacific Fleet Naval Aviation Antonov An-12BK airlifter is over Knevichi Airport, 2013

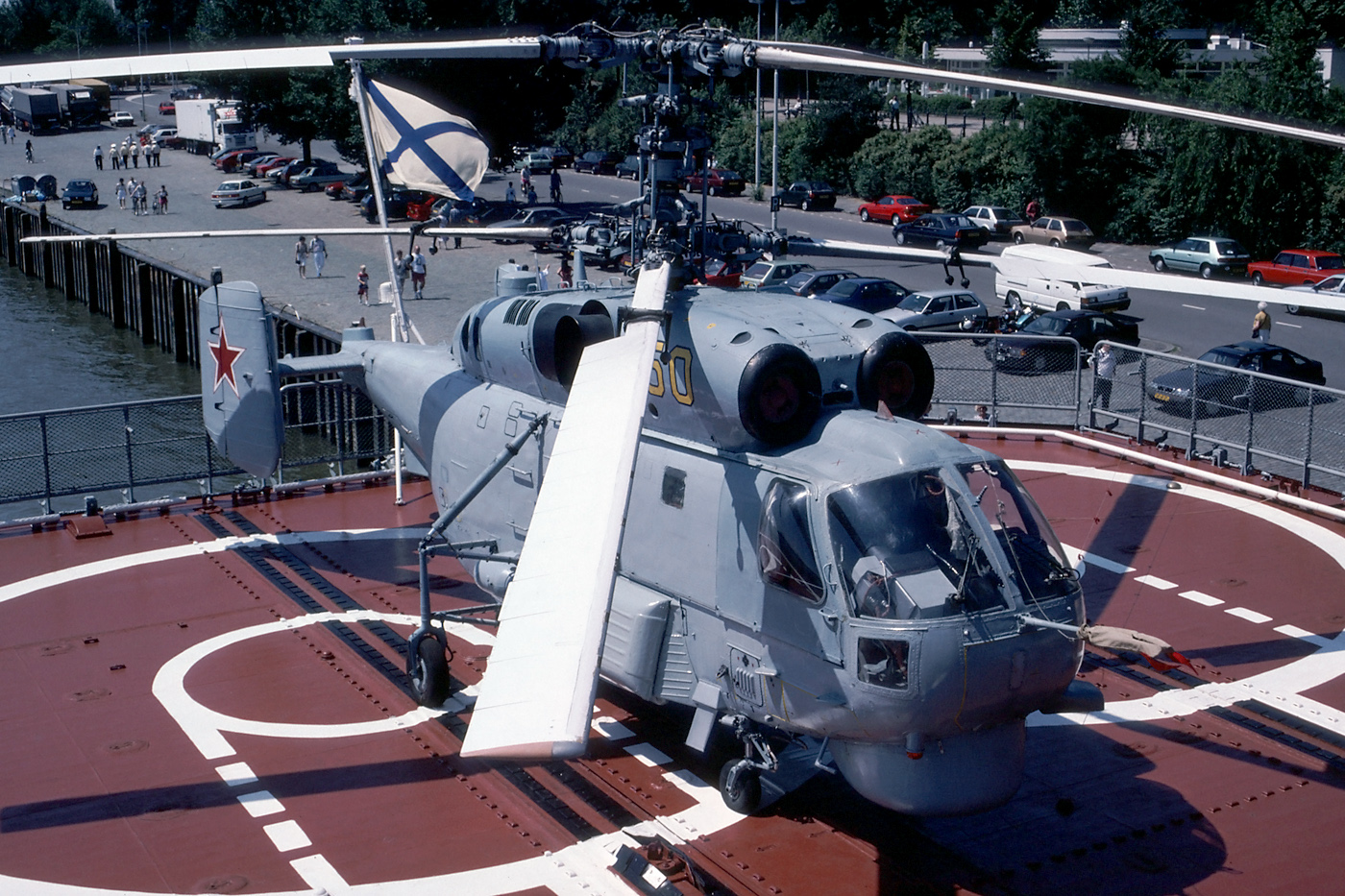
A Kamov Ka-27PL is on the helicopter deck of the Russian destroyer Admiral Kharlamov, 1994

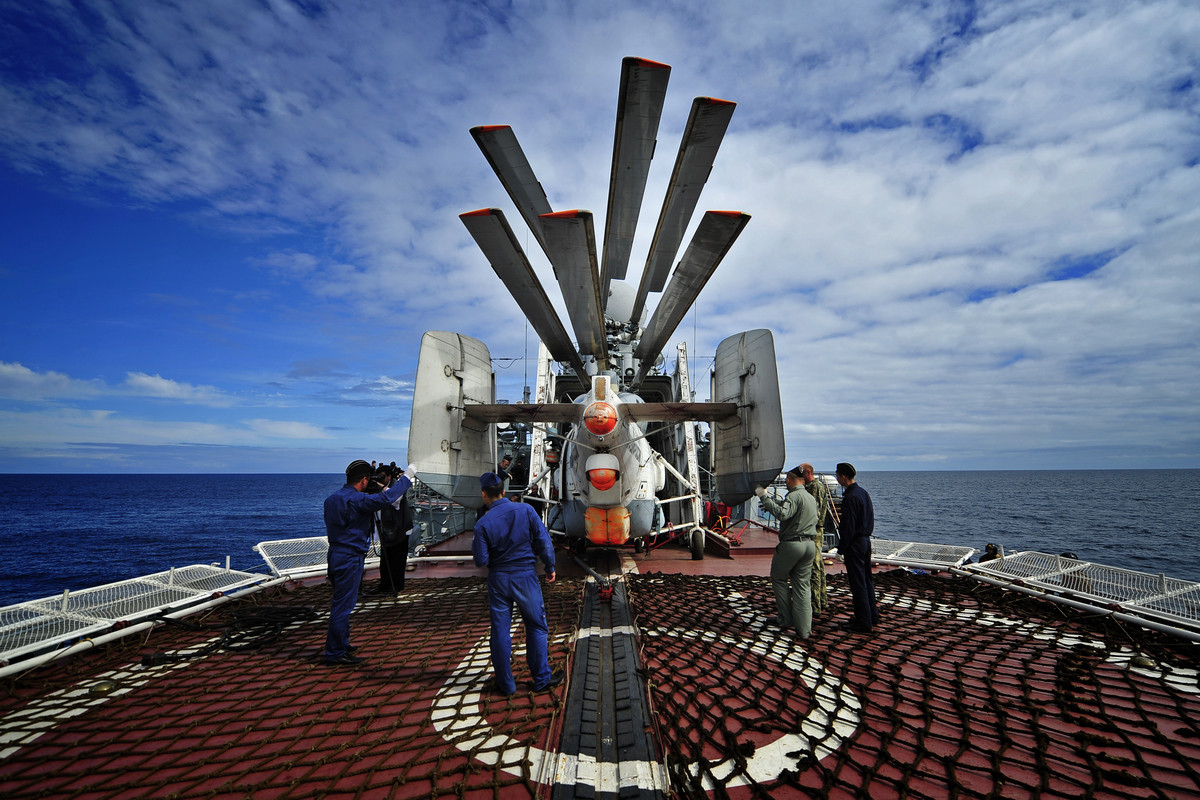
Russian aircraft maintenance technicians moving a Kamov Ka-27PS into the ship's helicopter hangar, 2015

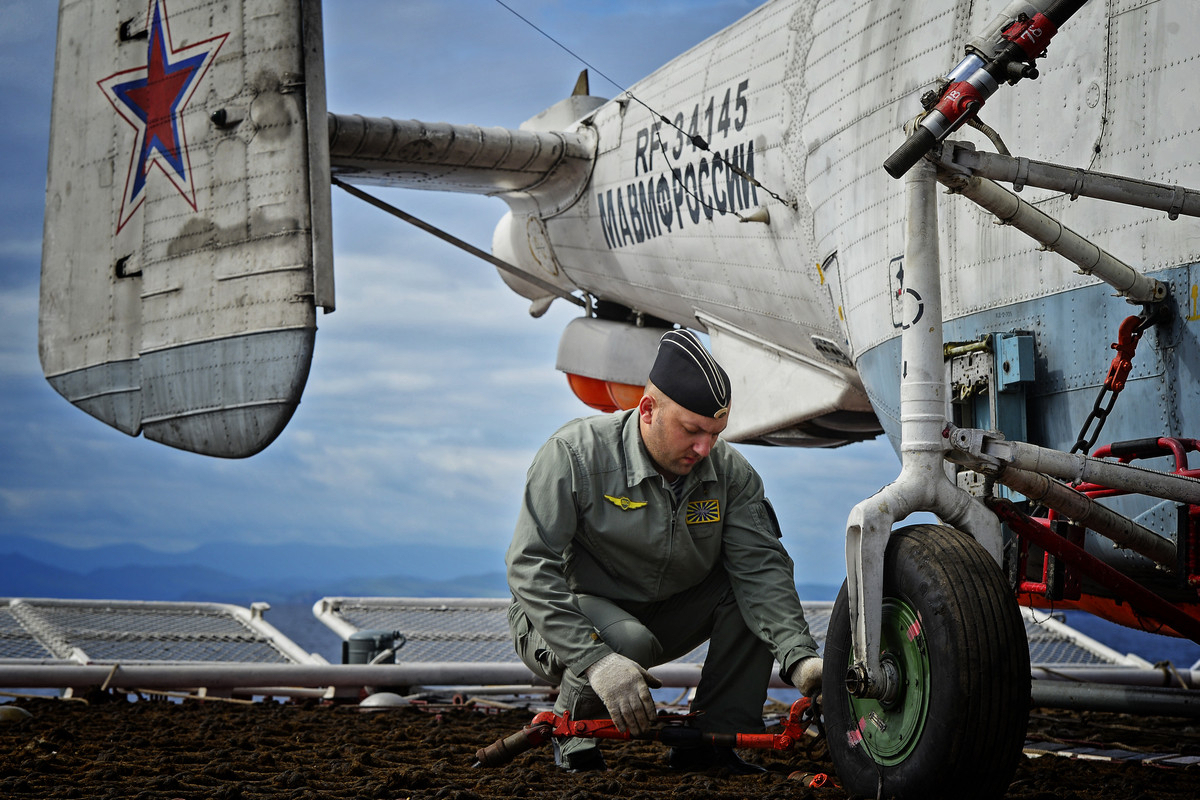
An aircraft maintenance technician inspecting a Kamov Ka-27PS on the helicopter deck, 2015

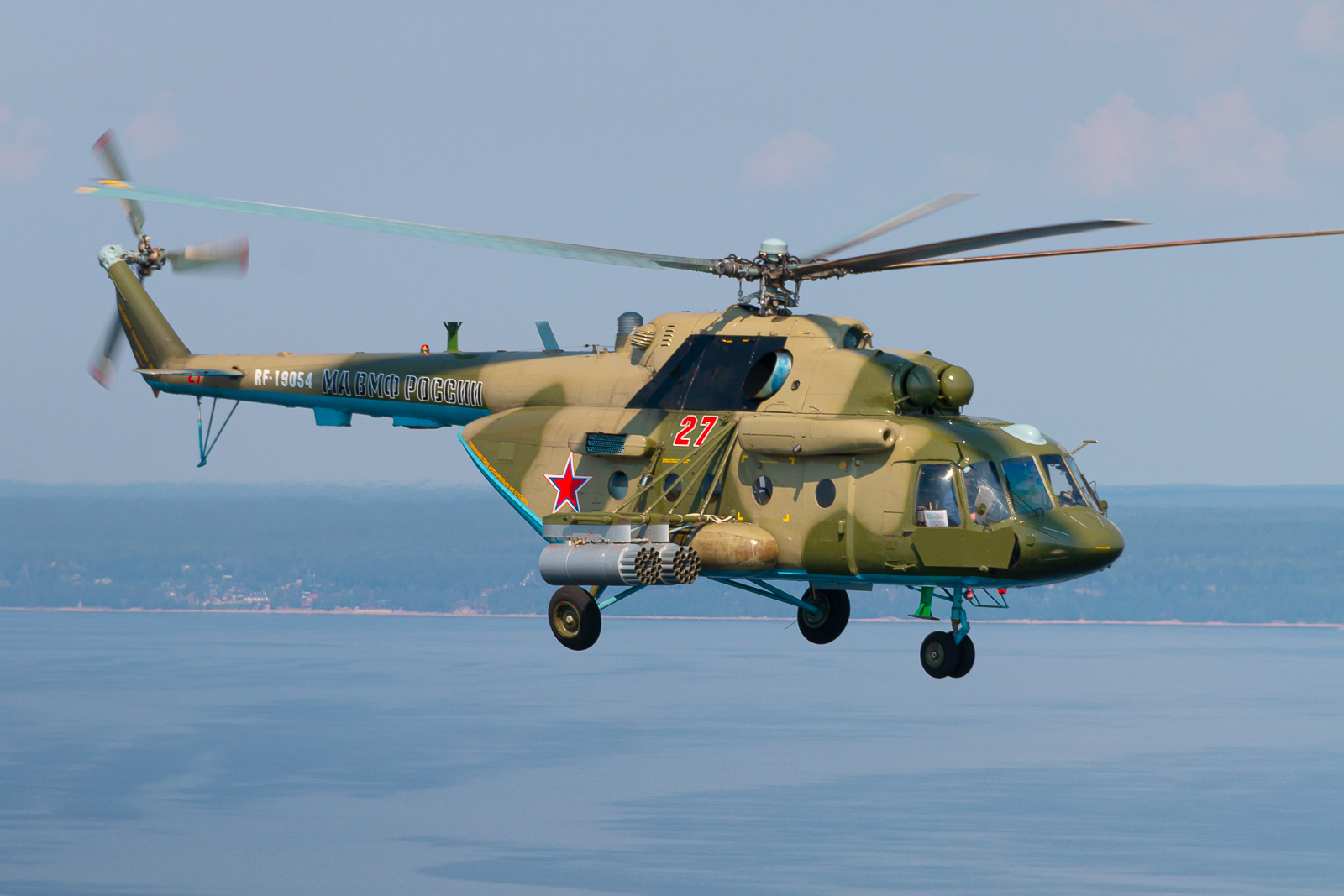
A Baltic Fleet Naval Aviation Mil Mi-8AMTSh helicopter flying over the Gulf of Finland, 2021

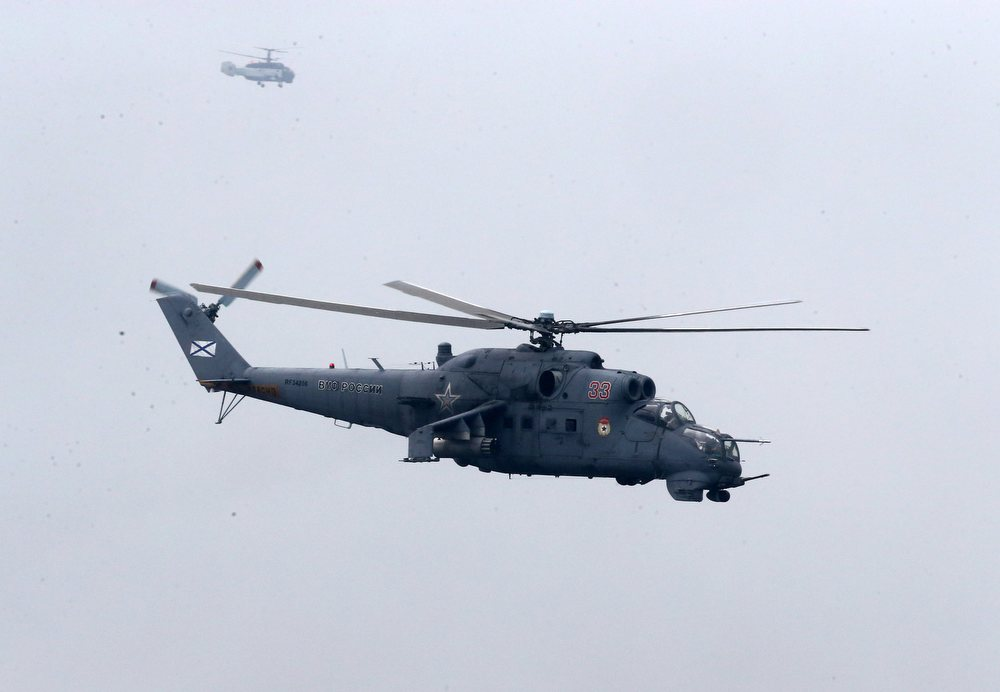
A Mil Mi-24VP and a Kamov Ka-27PS (background) of the Baltic Fleet Naval Aviation during a military exercise of the 336th Separate Guards Naval Infantry Brigade, 2017

== See also ==
- Soviet Naval Aviation
