= Kildin =

Kildin may refer to:

- Kildin Island
- Kildin-class destroyer
- Kildin Sami
- Ostrov (air base)
