= Kacha (air base) =

Airbase in Russian occupied Crimea

Kacha
- Kacha, Sevastopol, Crimea in Russian occupied Ukraine
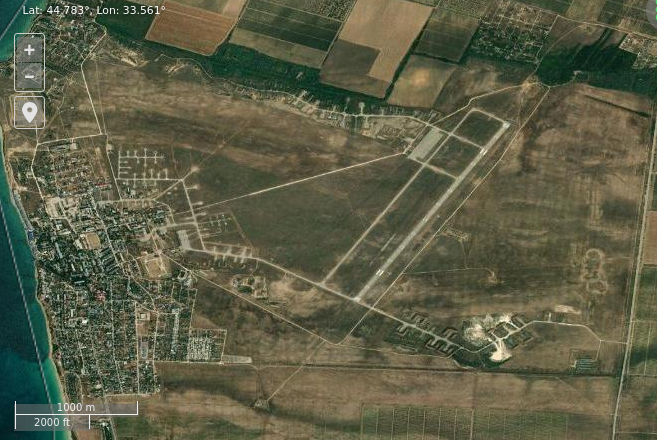
- Satellite imagery of Kacha air base

Site information
- Type: Air Base
- Operator: Russian Navy - Russian Naval Aviation
- Controlled by: Black Sea Fleet

Location
- Shown within Crimea Kacha (Russia)
- Coordinates: 44°46′59″N 33°33′41″E

Site history
- Built: 1945
- In use: 1945 - present
- Battles/wars: Russo-Ukrainian war (2022–present)

Airfield information
- Elevation: 45 metres (148 ft) AMSL
Runways
Direction	Length and surface
03/21	1,970 metres (6,463 ft) Concrete

Kacha is an airbase of the Russian Black Sea Fleet located in Kacha, Sevastopol, in Russian occupied Crimea. It is located 10 km north of Belbek Air Base.

== History ==
The base is used by the 318th Independent Composite Aviation Regiment flying the Antonov An-26KPA, Beriev Be-12 and the Tupolev Tu-134A and the 25th Independent Shipborne Anti-submarine Helicopter Regiment which flies the Mil Mi-8, Kamov Ka-27 and the Kamov Ka-29.

The base was used by the:

- 53rd Fighter Aviation Regiment between 1945 and 1946.
- 306th Fighter Aviation Regiment between 1945 and 1947.
- 859th Training Center for Naval Aviation between 1981 and 2009.

In September 2025 the Defense Intelligence of Ukraine (HUR MOU) claimed that a drone attack on 21 September destroyed two Be-12 amphibian planes and one Mi-8 helicopter. The Be-12 is an anti-submarine warfare platform that can patrol for sea drones. The serviceability of the two targeted Be-12 is unclear with one of them appearing to be missing its propellers.

On 5 December 2025, a drone attacked a MiG-29KR detached from the 100th Separate Shipborne Fighter Aviation Regiment.

== See also ==
- List of military airbases in Russia
