= Ilyushin Il-38 =

Soviet-Russian Maritime patrol & ASW aircraft

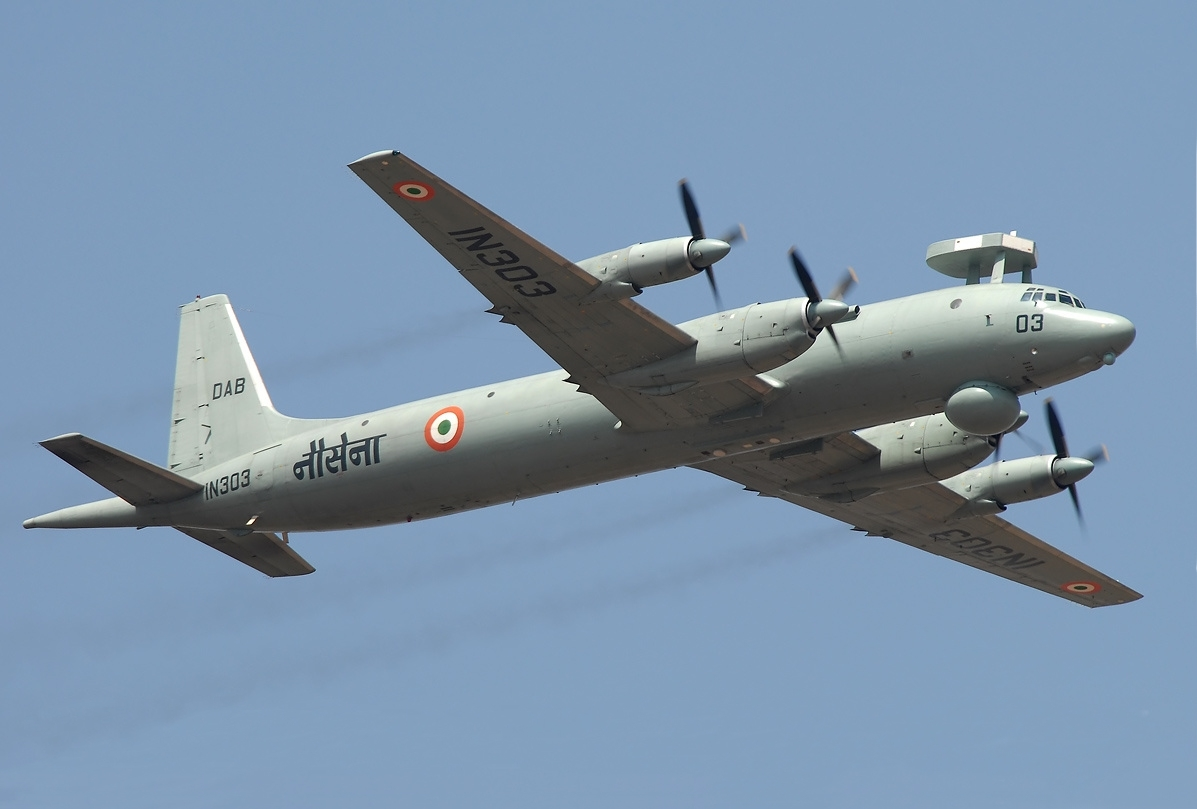
- Ilyushin Il-38SD of the Indian Navy in 2007.

General information
- Type: Anti-submarine warfare and maritime patrol aircraft
- Designer: Ilyushin
- Status: In limited service
- Primary users: Soviet Naval Aviation (historical) Russian Naval Aviation; Indian Naval Air Arm (historical)
- Number built: 58

History
- Manufactured: 1967–1972
- Introduction date: 1967
- First flight: 28 September 1961
- Developed from: Ilyushin Il-18

The Ilyushin Il-38 (nicknamed Dolphin) (NATO reporting name: May) is a maritime patrol aircraft and anti-submarine warfare aircraft designed in the Soviet Union. It is a variant of the Ilyushin Il-18 turboprop airliner.

== Design and development ==
The Il-38 is an adaptation of the four-engined turboprop Ilyushin Il-18 for use as a maritime patrol aircraft for the Soviet Navy. It met a requirement to counter American ballistic missile submarines. The Communist Party Central Committee and the Council of Ministers issued a joint directive on 18 June 1960, calling for a prototype to be ready for trials by the second quarter of 1962. The fuselage, wing, tail unit and engine nacelles were the same as the Il-18 and it had the same powerplant and flight deck. An aerodynamic prototype of the Il-38 first flew on 28 September 1961, with the first production aircraft following in September 1967. Production continued until 1972, when the longer-range and more versatile Tupolev Tu-142 derivative of the Tupolev Tu-95 strategic bomber entered service.

The airframe is based on the Il-18, with the wings moved forward 3 m (9.84 ft). Unlike the Il-18, only the forward fuselage of the Il-38 is pressurised. The tail contains a MAD, while under the forward fuselage a Berkut ("Golden Eagle") search radar (named "Wet Eye" by NATO) is housed in a bulged radome. There are two internal weapons bays, one forward of the wing, housing sonobuoys and one behind the wing housing weapons.

Some Western sources state that 58 were produced; the commander of the ASW squadron at Ostrov has stated that Soviet Naval Aviation received 35, of which about thirty remain in service with Russian Naval Aviation. Five were passed to India in 1977/8. In the mid-1990s it seems the Tu-204/Tu-214 airliner won a competition against the Beriev A-40/Be-42 amphibious plane to replace the Il-38 in Russian service, but a lack of funds crippled the project. More recently an A-40 variant seems to be under development to replace the Il-38.

India received three ex-Soviet Naval Aviation Il-38s in 1977, with two more arriving in 1983. Indian modifications included fitting pylons to the fuselage side to carry the Sea Eagle anti-ship missile. The Il-38s of the Indian Navy have been sent back to Russia for upgrades. They will incorporate the new Sea Dragon avionic suite, incorporating a new radar, a Forward looking infrared turret under the nose and an electronic intelligence system housed in a box-like structure mounted on struts above the forward fuselage. Three upgraded aircraft, designated Il-38 SD, have been delivered to the Indian Navy. After two Il-38s were lost in a mid-air collision in 2002, two ex-Russian Il-38s were purchased in 2008, and these were delivered in Il-38 SD standard in 2009 and 2010 respectively. Indian Il-38s can also fire Kh-35E missiles.

In February 2017, it was reported that the Russian Navy would acquire 30 upgraded Il-38Ns.

== Operational history ==
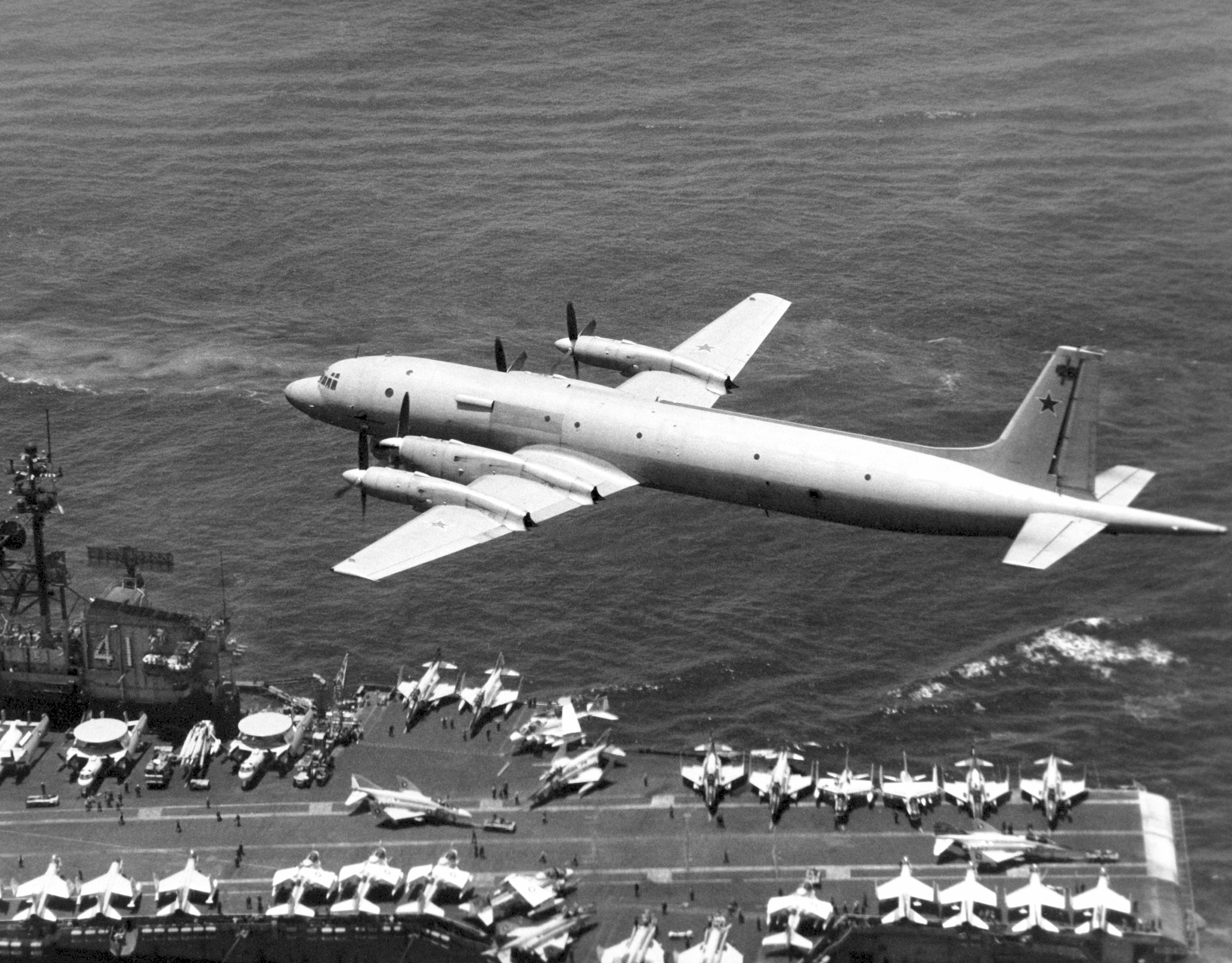
An IL-38 May passing low over USS Midway on 18 May 1979

One prototype was lost in the early 1970s when it was forced to ditch at sea.

The Il-38 was operated by units in the Soviet Northern, Pacific and Baltic fleets. In March 1968 a squadron of Il-38s deployed to Cairo in Egypt, flown by Soviet crews but in Egyptian markings, until withdrawn in 1972. Il-38s continued to deploy overseas through the Cold War, flying from Aden in South Yemen, Asmara in what was then Ethiopia, Libya and Syria. Two Il-38s were attacked on the ground in a commando raid and at least one was destroyed by Eritrean People's Liberation Front fighters in 1984 at Asmara. After the Cold War and the breakup of the Soviet Union, Il-38s continue in service with the Russian Navy's Arctic and Pacific Fleets.

Indian Naval Air Arm Il-38's, Breguet Alize's and Tu-142's were involved in the search of a hijacked cargo ship Progress Light during Operation Cactus on 4th July 1988. They helped direct gunfire from the frigates INS Godavari and INS Betwa during the engagement with Sri Lankan mercenary forces.

The type made its first visit to a NATO base in 1995, at NAS Jacksonville in United States. Its first appearance at an airshow in the West was at the 1996 Royal International Air Tattoo in United Kingdom.

A midair collision occurred on 1 October 2002, during the Indian squadron's silver jubilee celebrations. IN302 and IN304, which were flying parallel to each other, collided above the Dabolim airport in Goa. All twelve aircrew (six aboard each aircraft) were killed and both aircraft were destroyed.

On 31 October 2023, the Indian Navy retired all 3 of their aircraft with a cumulative total of 46 years and 55000 hours of surveillance over the seas. They have been replaced by Boeing P-8I Neptune and HAL 228 aircraft as a part of the modernisation of the navy.

In December of 2025, a Russian Il-38N aircraft was seriously damaged and disabled by a Ukrainian drone at the Yeysk air base.

== Variants ==
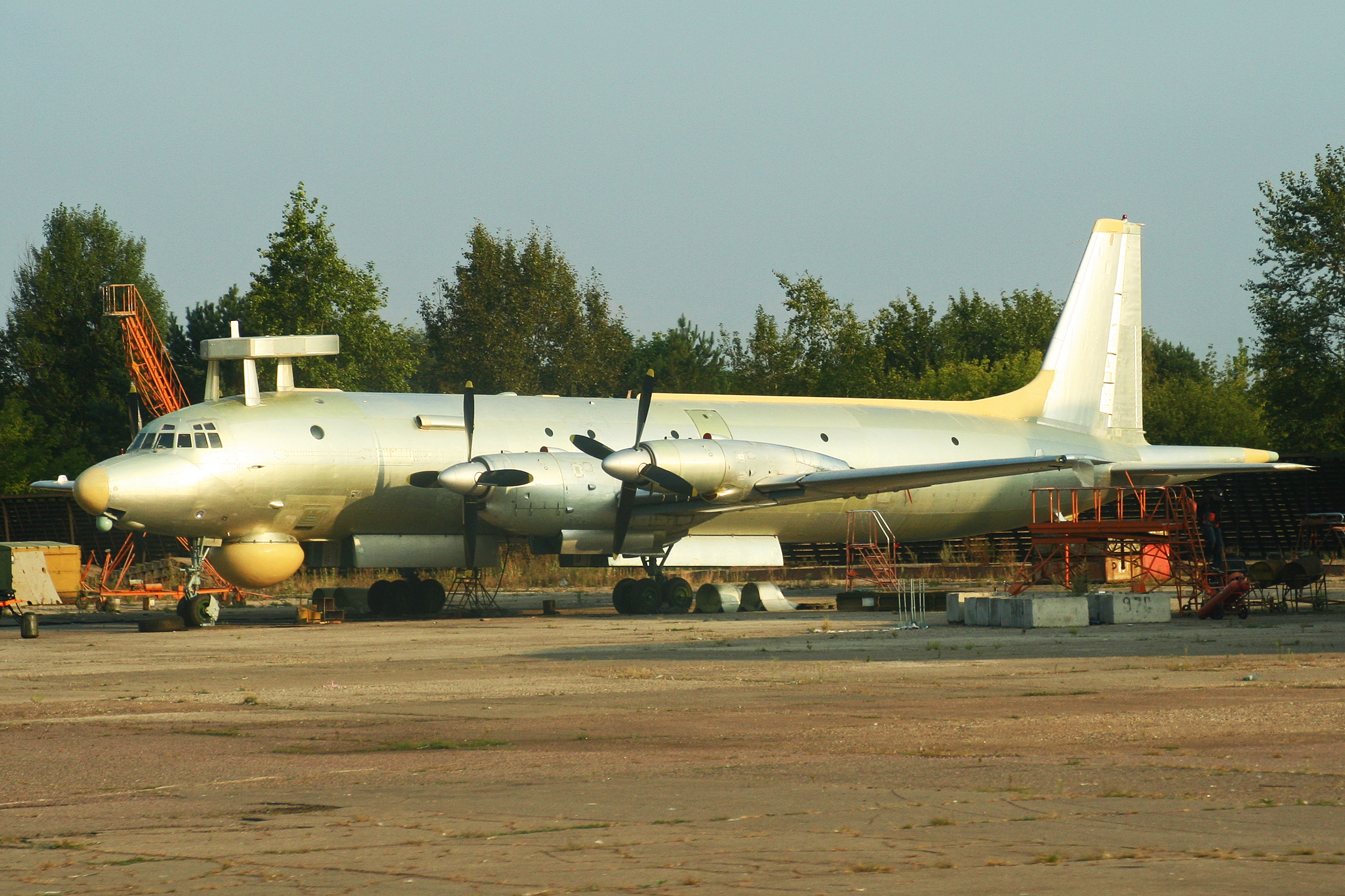
An unmarked Ilyushin IL-38, which was later delivered to the Indian Navy in 1983 and was the navy's first Il-38 to be modernised to SD standard.

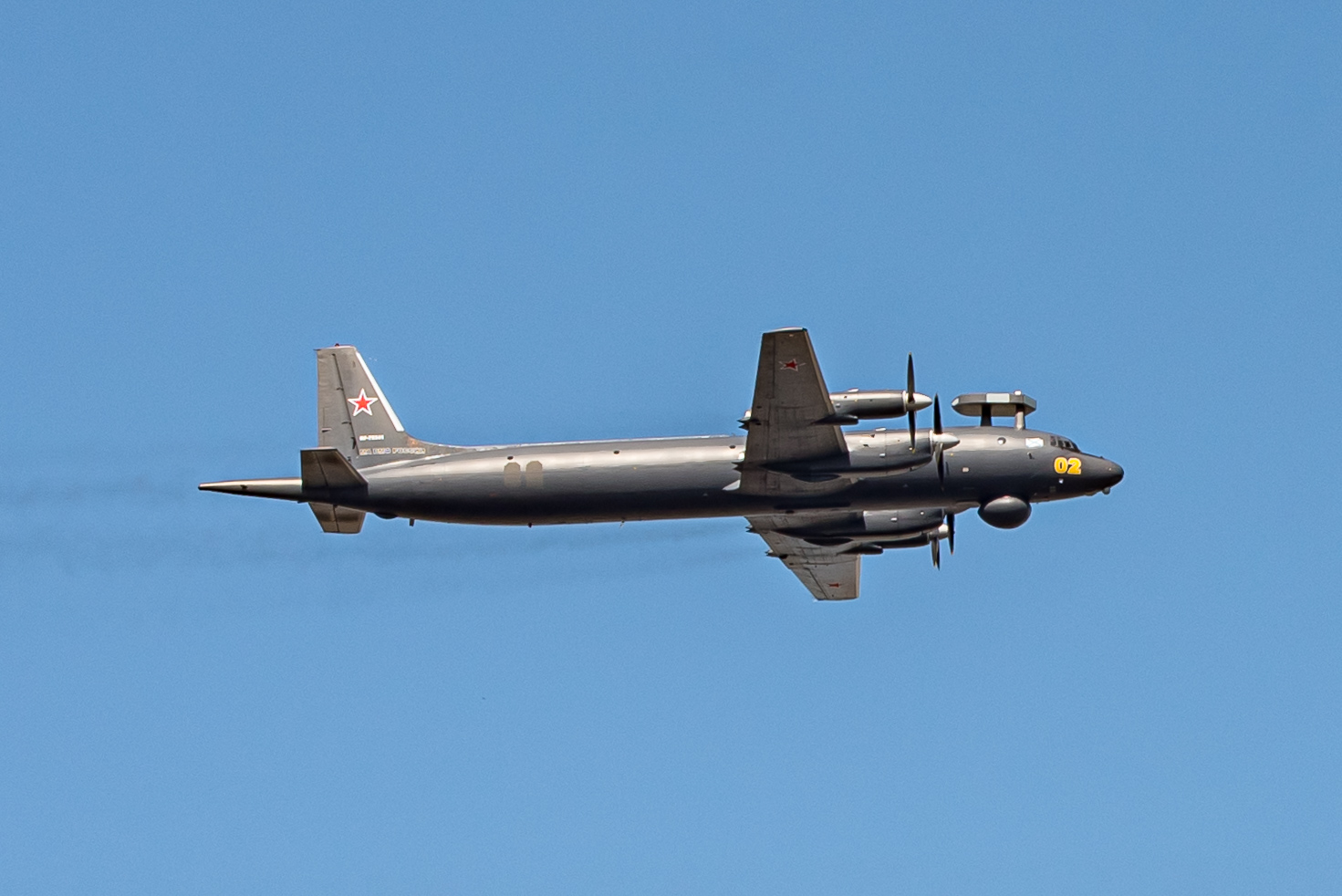
Ilyushin Il-38N in 2020

Il-38
Production aircraft
Il-38M
Modified with a receiver probe as part of a probe and drogue air refueling system. System not adopted.
Il-38SD
ISD-38MZ
Tanker variant of the Il-38. Prototype only
Il-38N
Improved variant sometimes referred to as Il-38SD for Sea Dragon, which is a new search and tracking system. The Russian Navy version is equipped with the Novella P-38 system. Novella P-38 is able to find air targets at ranges of up to 90 kilometres and follow surface objects within a radius of 320 kilometres, can track 32 above- and underwater targets simultaneously. 8 aircraft have been delivered to the Russian Navy. Modernised anti-submarine planes have entered into service with Russia’s Pacific and Northern Fleets.

== Operators ==
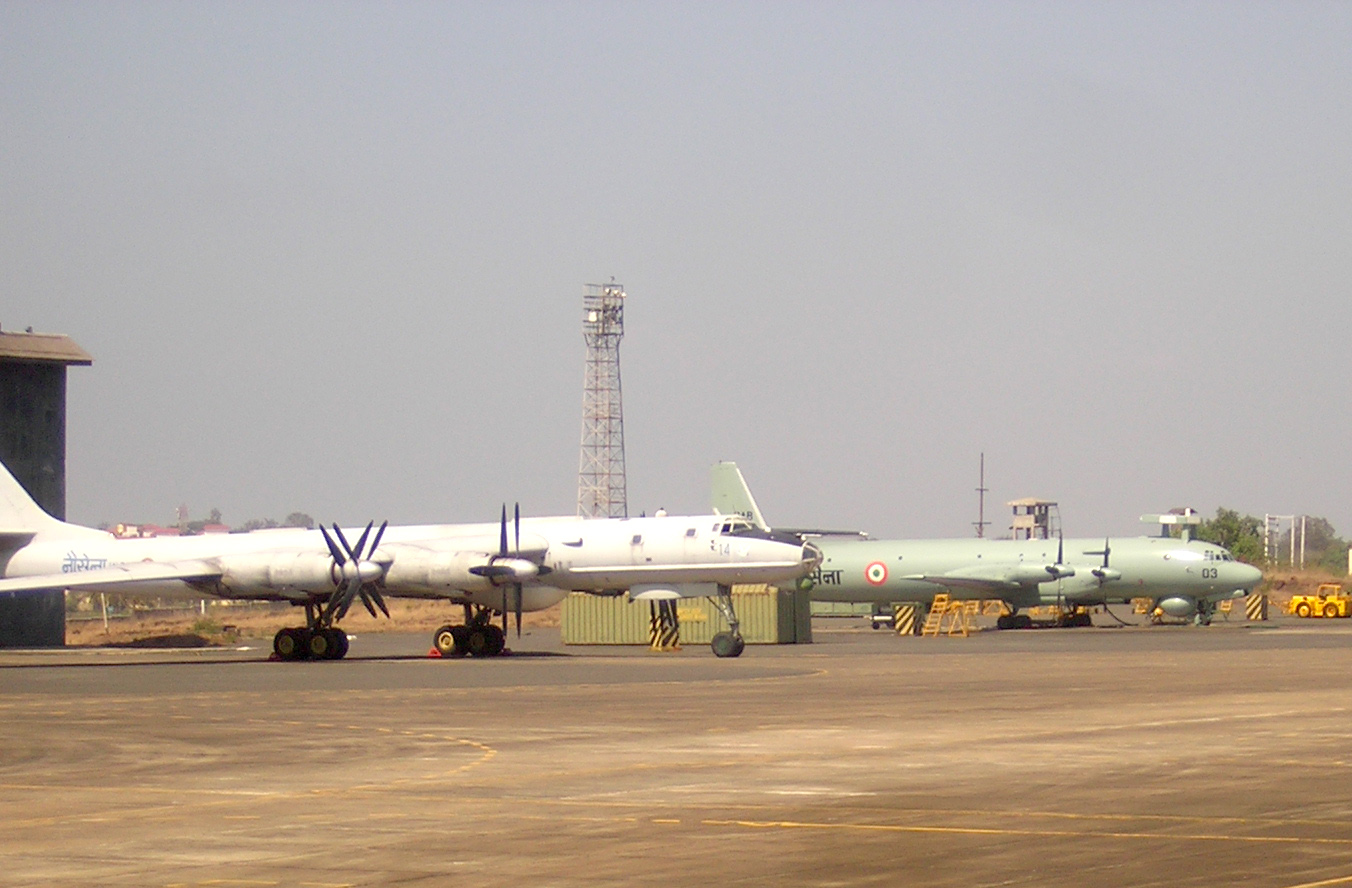
Il-38 of the Indian Navy at INS Hansa in Goa in 2006, with a Tupolev Tu-142 in the foreground

Russia

- Russian Naval Aviation

=== Former operators ===
Soviet Union

- Soviet Naval Aviation

India

- Indian Naval Air Arm: Operated a total of 7 aircraft. Of these, 3 were delivered in 1977, followed by 2 in 1983. Two were lost in a mid-air collision in 2002, and were replaced by two ex-Russian Il-38s in 2009 and 2010. The type was retired from Indian service on 31 October 2023.

== Aircraft on display ==
India

- IN-301: Preserved at the National Maritime Heritage Complex, Lothal, India. The first Il-38 to enter Indian service, IN-301 was commissioned on 1 October 1977. In 2002, the aircraft was converted to Il-38SD standard. She was decommissioned in January 2022, and subsequently transferred for preservation.
- IN-305: Preserved at the Naval Aviation Museum (Goa), Goa, India. This aircraft entered service in 1983, and was upgraded to Il-38SD standard in 2002. The aircraft was the first Indian Il-38 to be retired, and was retired in December 2018, subsequently being sent for preservation in 2020.
- IN-306: To be preserved at the Naval Aviation Museum (Goa), Goa, India. This aircraft was one of two second-hand Russian Il-38s purchased from Russia in 2008 to bolster fleet numbers. The aircraft was retired on 31 October 2023, subsequently being marked for preservation in 2023.
- IN-302 or IN-307: One of these two aircraft will be preserved at Nipani, Karnataka, India after the type's retirement.

== Specifications (Il-38) ==
Data from Russian Navy at RIAT 1996

General characteristics

- Crew: seven-eight
- Length: 40.185 m (131 ft 10 in)
- Wingspan: 37.4 m (122 ft 8 in)
- Height: 10.17 m (33 ft 4 in)
- Wing area: 140 m^{2} (1,500 sq ft)
- Empty weight: 35,500 kg (78,264 lb)
- Max takeoff weight: 66,000 kg (145,505 lb)
- Powerplant: 4 × Ivchencko/Progress AI-20M turboprop engines, 3,151 kW (4,225 hp) each

Performance

- Maximum speed: 645 km/h (401 mph, 348 kn)
- Ferry range: 7,500 km (4,700 mi, 4,000 nmi)
- Endurance: 13 hours
- Service ceiling: 11,000 m (36,000 ft)
- Rate of climb: 5.33 m/s (1,049 ft/min)

Armament

- 20,000 lb (9,000 kg) of disposable stores, including depth charges, mines, torpedoes and bombs.
  - Kh-35E anti-ship missile

== See also ==
Related development

- Ilyushin Il-18

Aircraft of comparable role, configuration, and era

- Bréguet 1150 Atlantic
- Canadair CP-107 Argus
- Lockheed P-3 Orion
- Hawker Siddeley Nimrod
- Shaanxi KQ-200

== External life ==
- Media related to Ilyushin Il-38 at Wikimedia Commons
