= Kamenny Ruchey =

Kamenny Ruchey Sovetskaya Gavan Mongokhto Alekseyevka
- Каменный Ручей / Советская Гавань
- Sovetskaya Gavan, Khabarovsk Krai in Russia
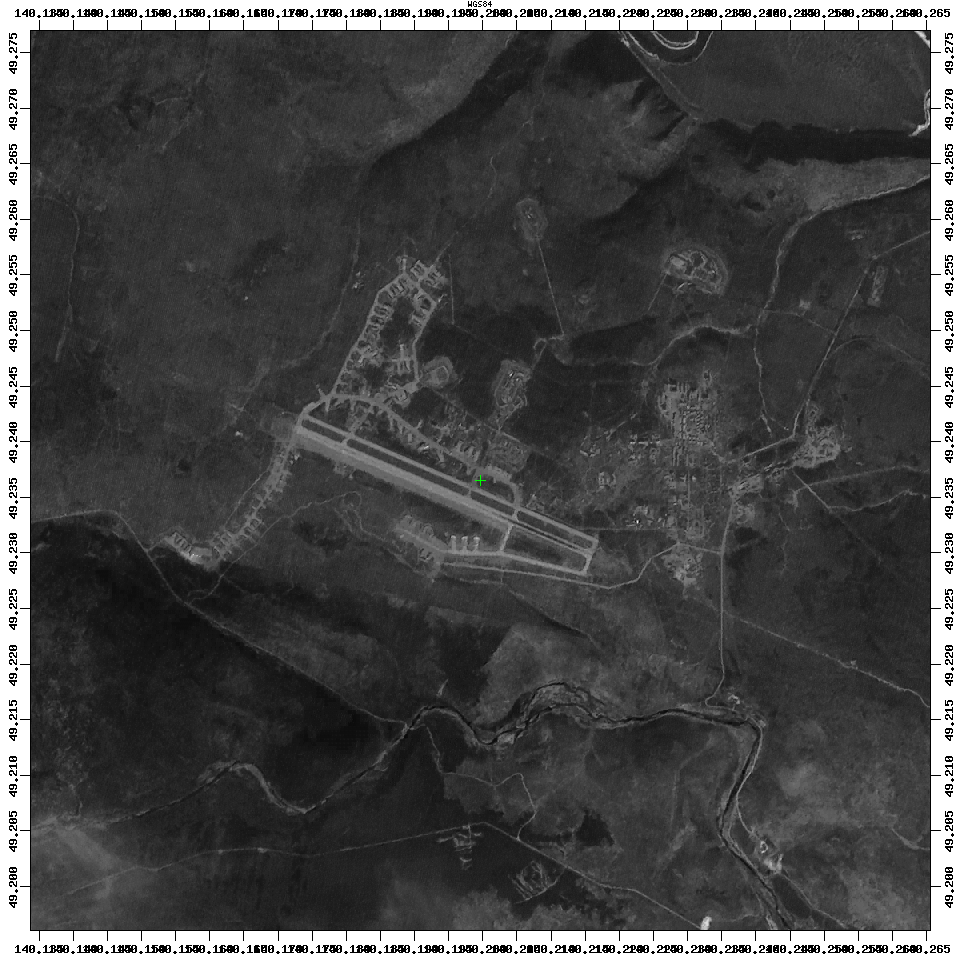
- Historical image of Kamenny Ruchey from June 1987 shortly after the peak of the Cold War

Site information
- Type: Air Base
- Owner: Ministry of Defence
- Operator: Russian Navy - Russian Naval Aviation
- Controlled by: Pacific Fleet

Location
- Shown within Khabarovsk Krai Kamenny Ruchey (Russia)
- Coordinates: 49°14′30″N 140°11′36″E

Site history
- Built: 1953
- In use: 1953 - present

Airfield information
- Identifiers: ICAO: UHKG
- Elevation: 201 metres (659 ft) AMSL
Runways
Direction	Length and surface
12/30	3,425 metres (11,237 ft) Concrete

Kamenny Ruchey (also Mongokhto, Alekseyevka, and Mongohto) (Russian: Монгохто, Каменный Ручей) (ICAO: UHKG) is an air base in Russia located 29 km north of Sovetskaya Gavan. Located just north of Vanino, it is a major military naval airfield that has 63 hardened areas. The airfield is designated by CAICA as Kamenny Ruchey, but Russian topographic maps indicate the nearby settlement northeast of the airfield is Mongokhto, which is also synonymous with the military base. The airfield was a joint Soviet Navy base with the 143 MRAD (143rd Naval Aviation Division), flying Tupolev Tu-16, Tupolev Tu-22M, and the 310 OPLAP (310th Independent Long Range Anti-Submarine Aviation Regiment) flying Tupolev Tu-142 aircraft.

The base is home to an Independent Anti-Submarine Aviation Squadron of the 7062nd Port-Arthur Naval Aviation Air Base.

== History ==
The airbase was completed in 1953. During the 1970s it was one of the largest bases in the Soviet Far East, with 8000 residents in Mongokhto. The Navy nuclear weapons storage is either at this airfield or at Maygatka. In 1997 50 family members blocked the runway over back wages.

A 1971 CIA analysis indicated that the base had two regiments flying Tupolev Tu-16 Badger aircraft which were equipped with K-10S Kipper and Kh-22 Kitchen Anti-ship missiles. The Tu-16 aircraft were later phased out when the first Tupolev Tu-22M Backfire aircraft arrived starting in October 1980.

By 1982, the airfield supported two Tu-22M Backfire ASM regiments, two Tu-16 Badger ASM regiments, and one Tu-142 Bear-F ASW regiment subordinate to the Pacific Fleet Air Force.

The base was home to the:

- 310th Independent Long-Range Anti-Submarine Aviation Regiment from 1978.
- 568th Independent Guards Mixed Aviation Regiment from 1953.
- 570th Maritime Missile Aviation Regiment between 1953 and 1994.
