= Kacha, Sevastopol =

Kacha Кача Кача Qaçı
- Flag Coat of arms

- Location of Kacha within Sevastopol Kacha (Crimea) Kacha (Black Sea) Kacha (Ukraine) Kacha (European Russia)
- Coordinates: 44°46′0″N 33°33′0″E
- Country: Disputed; Russia, Ukraine
- Republic: Crimea
- Region: Sevastopol
- Elevation: 20 m (66 ft)

Population (2001)
  - Total: 4,996
- Time zone: UTC+4 (MSK)
- Postal code: 99804
- Area code: +380-692

Kacha (Ukrainian: Кача; Russian: Кача; Crimean Tatar: Qaçı) is an urban-type settlement under the City of Sevastopol's jurisdiction, a territory recognized by a majority of countries as part of Ukraine and incorporated by Russia as part of the Sevastopol federal subject.

== History ==
Kacha was founded in 1912. It received urban-type settlement status in 1938.

== Military outpost ==
There is an airbase in Kacha used by Russia and its Black Sea Fleet Naval Air Force as headquarters for the 25th Independent Anti-submarine Helicopter Regiment (25th AHR) and the 917th Independent Composite Air Regiment (917th ICAR). Occupied by Germany in part of 1942-part of 1944.

== Demographics ==
- 1926 — 366 inhabitants
- 1939 — 2,834 inhabitants
- 1989 — 5,783 inhabitants
- 2001 — 6,320 inhabitants

== See also ==
- Hvardiiske, Simferopol Raion
