= Severomorsk (disambiguation) =

Severomorsk is a city in Murmansk Oblast, Russia.

Severomorsk may also refer to:

- Severomorsk-1, an air base, Russia
- A former name of Safonovo-1, an air base, Russia
- Severomorsk-2, an air base, Russia
- Severomorsk-3 (disambiguation)
- Russian destroyer Severomorsk (ru:Североморск (большой противолодочный корабль))
