= Novofedorivka (disambiguation) =

Novofedorivka is a town in Saky Raion, Crimea, Ukraine.

Novofedorivka or Novofyodorovka may also refer to:

- Novofedorivka, Dzhankoi Raion, a village in Crimea, Ukraine
- Novofedorivka Kirovske Raion, a village in Crimea, Ukraine
- Novofedorivka, Polohy Raion, Zaporizhzhia Oblast, a village in Ukraine
- Novofyodorovka, Altai Krai, a rural locality in Russia
- Novofyodorovka, Republic of Bashkortostan, a rural locality in Russia

== See also ==
- Novofedorovka, a rural locality in Bashkortostan, Russia
