= Severomorsk-3 =

Severomorsk-3 may refer to:

- Severomorsk-3 (rural locality), a rural locality (an inhabited locality) in Murmansk Oblast, Russia
- Severomorsk-3 (air base), a naval air base in Murmansk Oblast, Russia

== See also ==
- Severomorsk
