= Temur Apakidze =

Soviet Georgian and Russian Georgian Naval Aviation General (1954-2001)

Temur Avtandilis Dze Apakidze
- თემურ აფაქიძე Тимур Автандилович Апакидзе
- Born: 4 March 1954; Tbilisi, Georgian SSR
- Died: 17 July 2001 (aged 47); Ostrov, Russian Federation
- Military career
- Allegiance: Soviet Union; Russian Federation; Russia
- Branch: Soviet Naval Aviation; Russian Naval Aviation
- Service years: 1975–2001
- Rank: Major General
- Commands: Carrier Battle Group fighter squadrons; 100th Fighter Regiment; 279th Naval Fighter Regiment; 57th Mixed Air Division, Northern Fleet
- Awards: Hero of the Russian Federation; Honoured Military Pilot of the Russian Federation

Temur Avtandilis Dze Apakidze (Georgian: თემურ ავთანდილის ძე აფაქიძე, Russian: Тимур Автандилович Апакидзе, Timur Avtandilovich Apakidze; 4 March 1954 – 17 July 2001) was a Russian major general of Georgian ethnicity, fighter pilot, flight specialist and founder of the modern Russian Naval Aviation and Hero of the Russian Federation.

== Early life and education ==
Temur Apakidze was born in Tbilisi, Georgian SSR to a Russian mother and a Georgian father from the noble Georgian princely House of Apakidze. His mother moved with him to Leningrad when he was one year old. There he grew up and attended school. After graduating from 8th grade Apakidze enrolled in the Leningrad Nakhimov Naval School. In 1971, on the eve of graduation, the chief commander of the academy telegraphed Admiral Sergey Gorshkov about Apakidze's exceptional skills and requested his return to the fleet as soon as he had finished flight school. The Admiral agreed and from 1971 Apakidze began serving in the Soviet military as a naval aviator. The same year he became a cadet of the Yeysk Higher Military Aviation School.

== Military service ==
In 1975, after his EVVAU graduation in Yeysk, Temur Apakidze was assigned, with the rank of lieutenant, to the 846th Separate Guards Naval Attack Aviation Regiment "VP Chkalov" of the Baltic Fleet. By 1983, having already been promoted to major, he acted as deputy commander for the same regiment's flight training. During that appointment he introduced hand-to-hand combat training for pilots, being convinced that warriors without a weapon should know how to defend themselves if the situation demanded it. In 1986 after graduating from the Grechkov Naval Academy he was sent to the city of Nikolayev and appointed commander of the 100th Fighter Regiment. He studied shipborne aviation techniques at the "Center of Naval Aviation". From the late 1980s to the early 1990s he was considered the best Soviet, then Russian fighter pilot, being the first one who would land a Su-27K (Su-33) on deck of the aircraft carrier Admiral Kuznetsov on September 26, 1991. On the same day he performed another three landings and afterwards successfully tested the same maneuver at night and under difficult weather conditions, practically becoming the founder of modern Russian naval aviation. Prior to that Apakidze had lost one of the first aircraft of the series, code-named "T-10K-8", due to control malfunctions. He survived the incident by ejecting but repeatedly stated that he could not forgive himself for not having saved the fighter.

At the time of the collapse of the Soviet Union in 1991, Apakidze served as chief of air combat and tactical training for naval aviation in Saki, Crimea. Refusing to pledge allegiance to Ukraine and also rejecting an offer from the reestablished Republic of Georgia to head its air force, reportedly saying "Take an oath only once", he departed with at least 16 of his regiment's (the 100th Independent Shipborne Fighter Aviation Regiment) pilots to Severomorsk, Russia taking the regimental colors with him. In 1992 he was appointed commander of Russia's only naval fighter regiment, the 279th (Severomorsk-3). Serving from March 1993 as deputy commander and from November 1994 as commander of the 57th Mixed Air Division of the Northern Fleet, Timur Avtandilovich Apakidze was awarded the title Hero of the Russian Federation and distinction Gold Star by the President of the Russian Federation on 17 August 1995, for the development of efficient carrier based education and training programs and his daring and numerous experimental flight tests with the Su-33. Later that year division commander Apakidze departed with the aircraft carrier Kuznetsov for the Mediterranean Sea for combat duty. During the campaign, which ended in March 1996, his pilots performed 2,500 landings. Apakidze performed take-offs up to seven times a day, giving an example to others. It was around that time that two Israeli F-16s engaged a Russian Su-33 trespassing Israel's airspace but were outmaneuvered. The Russian pilot managed to place himself behind the F-16s that were chasing him but then withdrew.

Despite these impressive efforts and results, flight activity and intensity dropped from then on. At that point, the only Russian aircraft carrier moved out at sea for only two or three weeks' worth of maneuver training a year, until such activities were ceased completely. Shipborne fighter jets numbered no more than 15 at a time. However it was due to Apakidze's commitment that the Admiral Kuznetsov wasn't scrapped like other Soviet vessels as the result of drastic financial cuts in the military, especially the navy. In 1997 Major General Apakidze started teaching the so-called "Pugachev's Cobra" and "Bell" to his subordinates, who then would teach their students. However, they didn't catch on in the long run, since those techniques are considered unconventional and are not covered by any regulations and therefore aren't implemented as a standard drill for Russian fighter pilots. Apakidze was one of only five pilots in the world to master Pugachev's Cobra. In 1998, General Apakidze attended the Military Academy of the General Staff of the Armed Forces of Russia and in 2001 was made deputy commander of the Naval Aviation training program. Despite being a senior officer and already tasked with important business, he never stopped flying. At the time of his death, he had flown for 3850 hours on 13 different aircraft and performed 283 deck landings on an aircraft carrier. Not a single pilot died under his command or during his service.

== Airshow accident and death ==
On 17 July 2001, during an airshow in honor of the 85th anniversary of Russian Naval Aviation, Apakidze's Su-33 crashed while performing maneuvers. At first the show went as planned, but when Apakidze performed a complex maneuver, he reported experiencing sudden technical difficulties and from the ground it could be seen that the plane was out of control. He did not eject despite receiving the command twice. Trying to fly away from the populated area, he aimed for the landing strip in an apparent effort to save the aircraft. Unfortunately, he only made it to within three kilometres (2 mi) of the runway. Shortly before the collision with the ground, he ejected from the cockpit and suffered multiple fractures, but he died on the way to the hospital and was buried in the Troyekurovskoye Cemetery. Busts and plaques were commissioned in his honor.

== Tributes and memorials ==
- On July 17, 2002, a monument was opened at the Troekurovsky cemetery (area 4).
- The name was given to one of the streets of the city Ostrov in Pskov Oblast, the street on which he lived in the city of Severomorsk—3 in Murmansk Oblast, and one of the streets in the village of Novofedorovka (the former Saki-4 garrison, Crimea).
- The name was given to Murmansk's School No. 57.
- At the crash site of the Su-33 fighter (Pskov Oblast) a memorial sign was installed.
- In the city of Severomorsk, Murmansk Oblast, a bust is installed on Safonov Square.
- In the village of Novofedorovka (the former garrison of Saki-4) a bust was installed on the Alley of Heroes.
- Memorial plaques in the Nakhimov School, in Saki, Kaliningrad and Severomorsk-3 were opened.
- T.A. Apakidze is dedicated to the song of the bard Konstantin Frolov “Talk with me about the wings.”
- On July 17, 2013, exactly 12 years after his death on the territory , a monument to the Su-33 carrierborne fighter was opened at the Komsomolsk-on-Amur Aircraft Plant. A portrait of T.A. Apakidze and the aircraft’s number “70” were applied to the aircraft.
- Every year since 2002, the Pskov Region Karate Cup named after Hero of the Russian Federation Timur Apakidze is held in the city of Velikie Luki. [7]
- In 2015, by order of the Minister of Defense of the Russian Federation, Major-General T.A. Apakidze was permanently enrolled in the lists of personnel of the Nakhimov Naval School.
- The name of the military-patriotic club "Cadets Aviation" in the city of Syzran.

== Honours and awards ==
- "Gold Star" Hero of the Russian Federation (17 August 1995)
- Order for Service to the Homeland in the Armed Forces of the USSR, 3rd class
- Order for Personal Courage
- Medal for Combat Service
- Jubilee Medal "300 Years of the Russian Navy"
- Jubilee Medal "60 Years of the Armed Forces of the USSR"
- Jubilee Medal "70 Years of the Armed Forces of the USSR"
- Medal "For Impeccable Service" 1st, 2nd and 3rd classes
- Honoured Military Pilot of the Russian Federation

== See also ==
- List of Heroes of the Russian Federation

== Literature ==
- Северикова Л. Л. Тимур и его небо: Воспоминания. Лариса Северикова. — Moscow: Издательство «Московская типография № 2», АПК И ППРО, 2009. — 120 с.

== Film coverage ==
- Forsage. Film of Natalia Gugueva about Timur Apakidze. 2001.
- Falcon Trail. The secret of the death of General Apakidze. Ren — TV. 2006
- On the investigation into the death of General T. Apakidze. Capital, Homeland Shield, 2006
- Timur. History of the last flight. Channel 1, 2005
