= Severomorsk-2 =

Severomorsk-2 (after 1965 Safonovo-1)
- Severomorsk, Murmansk Oblast in Russia
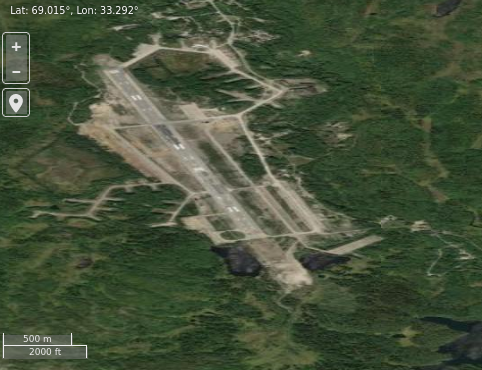
- Satellite imagery of Severomorsk-2 air base

Site information
- Type: Air Base
- Owner: Ministry of Defence
- Operator: Russian Navy - Russian Naval Aviation
- Controlled by: 45th Air and Air Defence Forces Army

Location
- Shown within Murmansk Oblast Severomorsk-2 (Russia)
- Coordinates: 69°0′54″N 33°17′30″E

Site history
- Built: 1952
- In use: 1952 - present

Airfield information
- Elevation: 77 metres (253 ft) AMSL
Runways
Direction	Length and surface
15/33	1,900 metres (6,234 ft) Concrete

Severomorsk-2 (also Safonovo-1 (USSR), Murmansk Northeast (US)) is a naval air base in Murmansk Oblast, Russia located 7 km southwest of Severomorsk and 11 km northeast of Murmansk.

The primary operator of Severomorsk-2 (after 1965 Safonvo-1) was 403 ODLAP (403rd Independent Long Range Aviation Regiment) operating Beriev Be-12PS search and rescue aircraft. It is a relatively small airfield compared to nearby Severomorsk-1, and was closed in 1998.

The base was home to the:

- 38th Independent Shipborne Anti-Submarine Helicopter Regiment between 1981 and 1993.
- 912th Independent Transport Aviation Regiment until 1960
- 830th Independent Shipborne Anti-Submarine Helicopter Regiment between 1960 and 2001.
- 524th Fighter Aviation Regiment VVS VMF between 1952 and 1960.

In mid-2022, Admiral Aleksandr Alekseyevich Moiseyev announced that the air base would be reconstructed.

== See also ==
- Severomorsk
- Severomorsk-1
- Severomorsk-3
