= 100th Independent Shipborne Fighter Aviation Regiment =

Russian Navy's Naval Aviation regiment

The 100th Separate Shipborne Fighter Aviation Regiment (100 okiap) (Russian: 100-й отдельный корабельный истребительный авиационный полк (100 окиап); Military Unit Number 45782) is a fighter regiment of the Russian Naval Aviation, formed in 2015. Based at Severomorsk-3, the regiment is part of the 45th Air and Air Defence Forces Army of the Northern Fleet. The regiment continues the history of the 100th Shipborne Fighter Aviation Regiment of Soviet Naval Aviation.

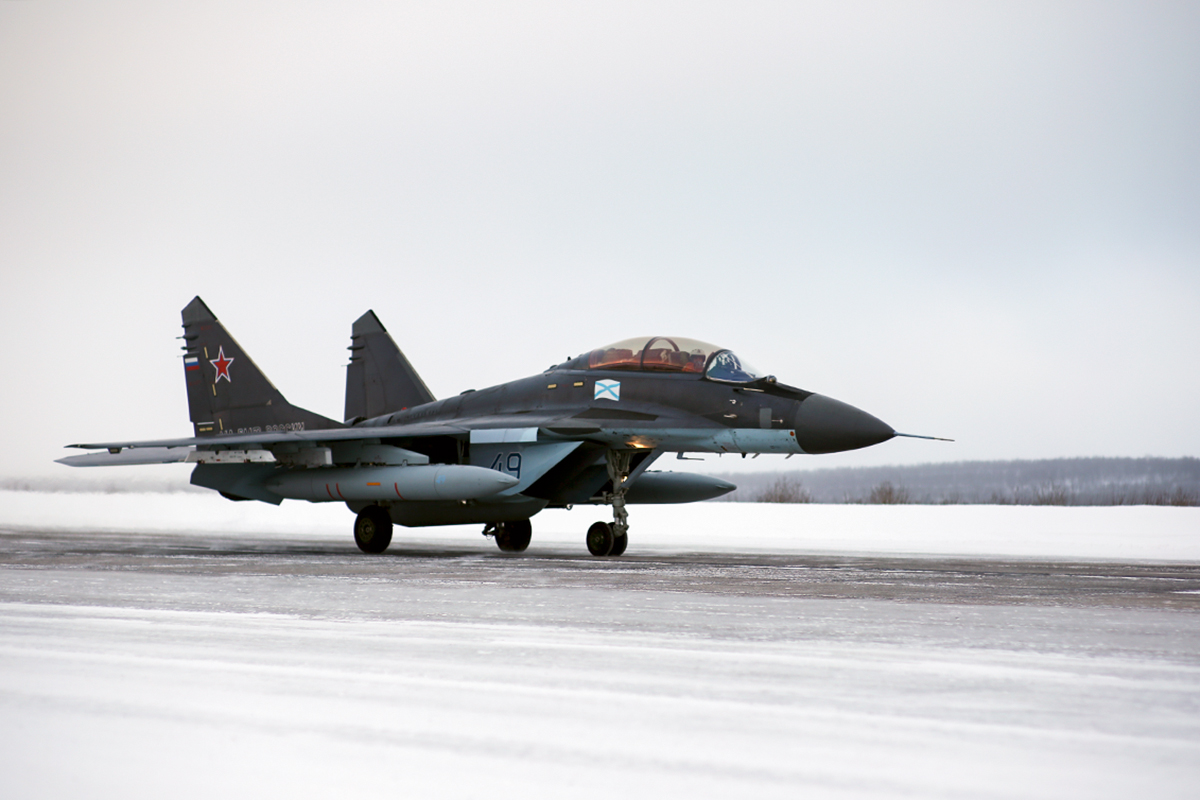
A MiG-29 of the 100th OKIAP lands at its base at Severomorsk.

It was formed at Saky air base in the Crimea on 10 March 1986, and five months later, placed under the 39th Control for the Test Training Facility of Shipborne Aviation. For most of its existence, it flew the Su-27, MiG-29, L-39 and Su-25 aircraft. In January 1992, many of its personnel, led by regimental commander Lieutenant Colonel Timur Apakidze, refused to take the oath of loyalty to Ukraine, which would have presumably made them part of the Ukrainian Navy or Ukrainian Air Force, and instead its personnel left for Russia, leaving their aircraft and equipment behind. Personnel regrouped at Severomorsk-3 air base, as part of the Northern Fleet. In February 1993, the regiment was disbanded and its personnel and equipment absorbed by the 279th Shipborne Fighter Aviation Regiment.

On 1 December 2015, the 100th KIAP was reformed at the Yeysk air base, Krasnodar Krai and was equipped with 24 MiG-29KR/KUBR carrier-based multi-role fighters, built between 2013 and 2015. The regiment is also a supplementary unit to the 279th OKIAP at Severomorsk-3 air base, Murmansk Oblast operating the Su-33 carrier-based fighters.

By 2016, in line with previous plans, the regiment had been transferred back to the Northern Fleet at Severomorsk-3 on the Kola Peninsula.
