= Boris Safonov =

Soviet aviator (1915–1942)

Boris Feoktistovich Safonov
- Борис Феоктистович Сафонов
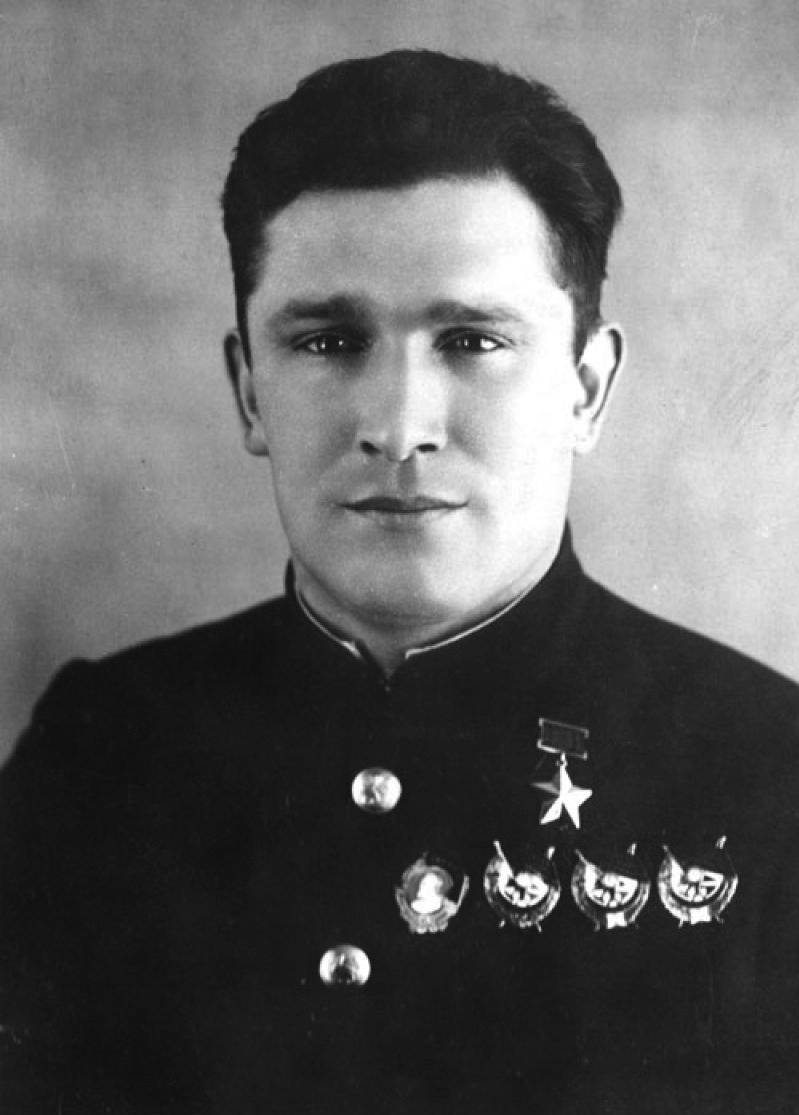
- Born: 26 August [O.S. 13 August] 1915; Plavsky District, Tul'skaya oblast
- Died: 30 May 1942 (aged 26); Barents Sea, Murmansk Oblast
- Military career
- Allegiance: Soviet Union
- Branch: Soviet Naval Aviation
- Service years: 1933–1942
- Rank: Lieutenant colonel
- Unit: 15th Fighter Aviation Regiment
- Commands: 78th Fighter Aviation Regiment; 2nd Guards Mixed Aviation Regiment
- Conflicts: World War II; Winter War; Eastern Front
- Awards: Hero of the Soviet Union (twice)

Boris Feoktistovich Safonov (Russian: Бори́с Феокти́стович Сафо́нов); 26 August [O.S. 13 August] 1915 – 30 May 1942) was a Soviet Naval Aviation fighter ace of World War II who was twice awarded the title Hero of the Soviet Union.

== Early life ==
Safonov was born to a peasant family in the village of Sinyavino, now in the Plavsky District of Tula Oblast on 26 August 1915. After graduating from seven grades, he entered the Tula Railway Training College in the late 1920s. While studying at the college, he joined the local flying school, where his instructor was Valentina Grizodubova, who later became a celebrated military pilot. He was conscripted into the Red Army in 1933 and on completing his flying training at the Kacha Higher Military Aviation School, was posted to the Belorussian Military District. He served in the 106th Dzerzhinsky Fighter Aviation Squadron of the 40th Aviation Brigade from 1934, later 15th Dzerzhinsky Fighter Aviation Regiment. In 1939, he joined the Communist Party of the Soviet Union. In 1940, he requested a transfer to the Northern Fleet Air Force.

== World War II ==
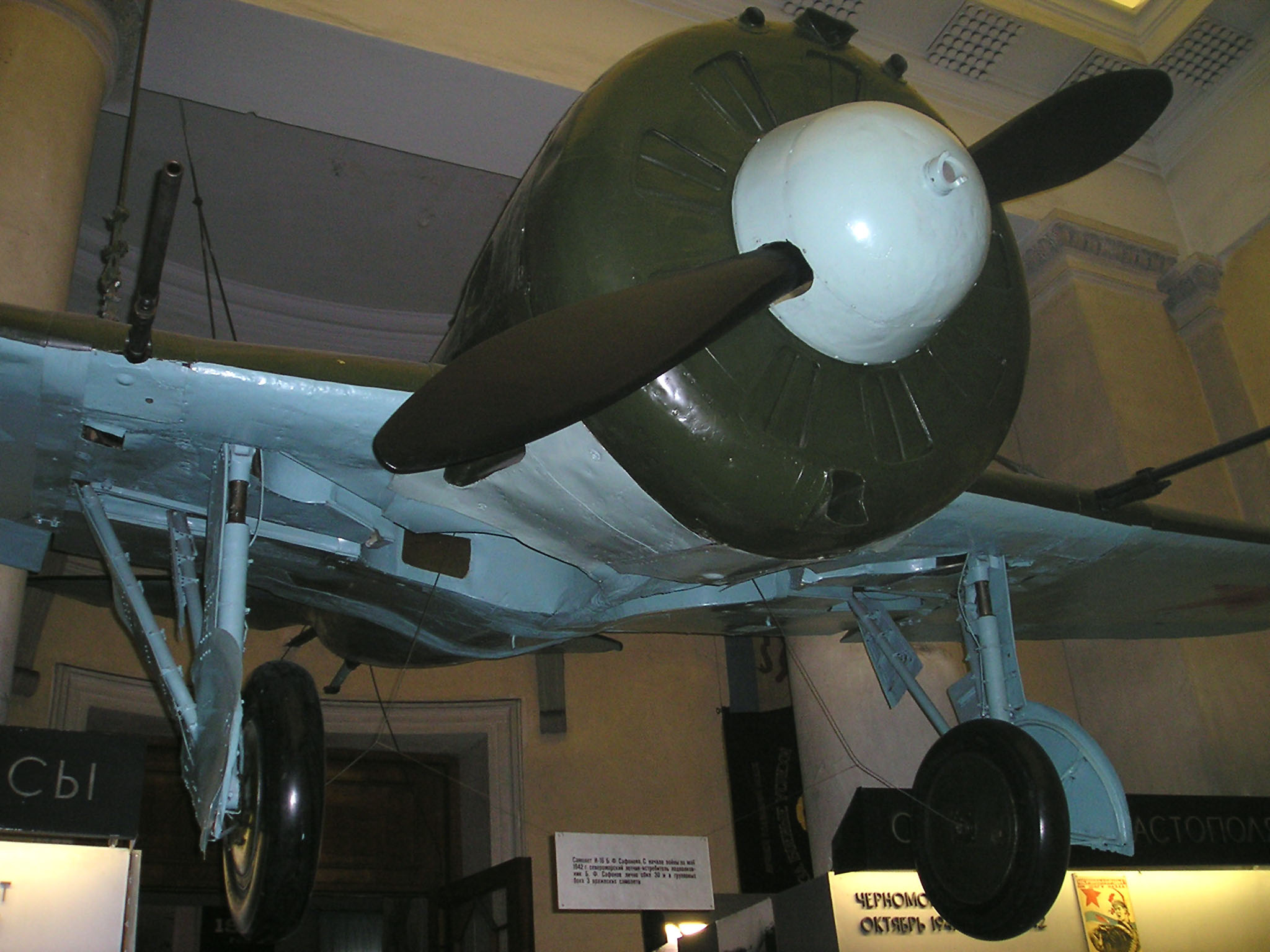
Safonov's Polikarpov I-16 fighter, displayed at the Central Naval Museum in Saint Petersburg.

At the beginning of the German-Soviet War, Safonov was based at Vaenga (now called Severomorsk) on the Murmansk Front, commanding the 4th Squadron of the 72nd Mixed Aviation Regiment, flying the Polikarpov I-16 fighter. A widely circulated photograph of Safonov showed him with an I-16 bearing the slogan "За Сталина!" (For Stalin!) on its fuselage, although this probably was not his personal machine.

In September 1941, No. 151 Wing RAF arrived at Vaenga by sea, with 39 Hawker Hurricane fighters which they were to train Soviet personnel to operate and then hand over. Safonov headed the Soviet side of the training programme and made a good impression on his British colleagues, who remembered him as serious and likeable. By the time he converted to the Hurricane, Safonov had already scored 14 individual and 6 shared victories with the I-16. He took command of a new squadron, part of the 78th Fighter Aviation Regiment of the Soviet Naval Aviation which was formed to fly the Hurricanes and was largely manned by his pilots from 72nd Mixed Aviation Regiment. As a commander, he showed exceptional organisational and tactical skills, while enforcing strict discipline on his men, once threatening to shoot a pilot whom he judged to have returned early from combat. However, he defended Sergey Kurzenkov who accidentally shot down a friendly bomber and often gave others the credit for his own kills.

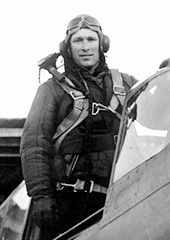
Safonov in 1942.

In March 1942, Safonov returned as a lieutenant colonel to command 72nd Mixed Aviation Regiment, by then renamed as the 2nd Guards Mixed Aviation Regiment. On 30 May, he took off for his 234th combat mission, flying a Curtiss P-40E to cover the approach of arctic convoy PQ-16. He shot down three Ju-88s, but crashed into the sea following engine failure. The convoy escorts were unable to find him.

== Final tally ==
Russian historians Andrey Simonov and Nikolai Bodrikhin credit Safonov with 20 solo and 5 shared shootdowns, based on official Soviet documents, while Mikhail Maslov credits him with an additional shared kill. Western historian Hugh Morgan suggested he had 25 individual and 14 shared.

== Awards and honors ==
- Twice Hero of the Soviet Union (16 September 1941 and 14 June 1942)
- Order of Lenin (16 September 1941)
- Three Order of the Red Banner (14 July 1941, 8 November 1941, and 15 January 1942)
- Distinguished Flying Cross (March 1942)

=== Remembrance ===
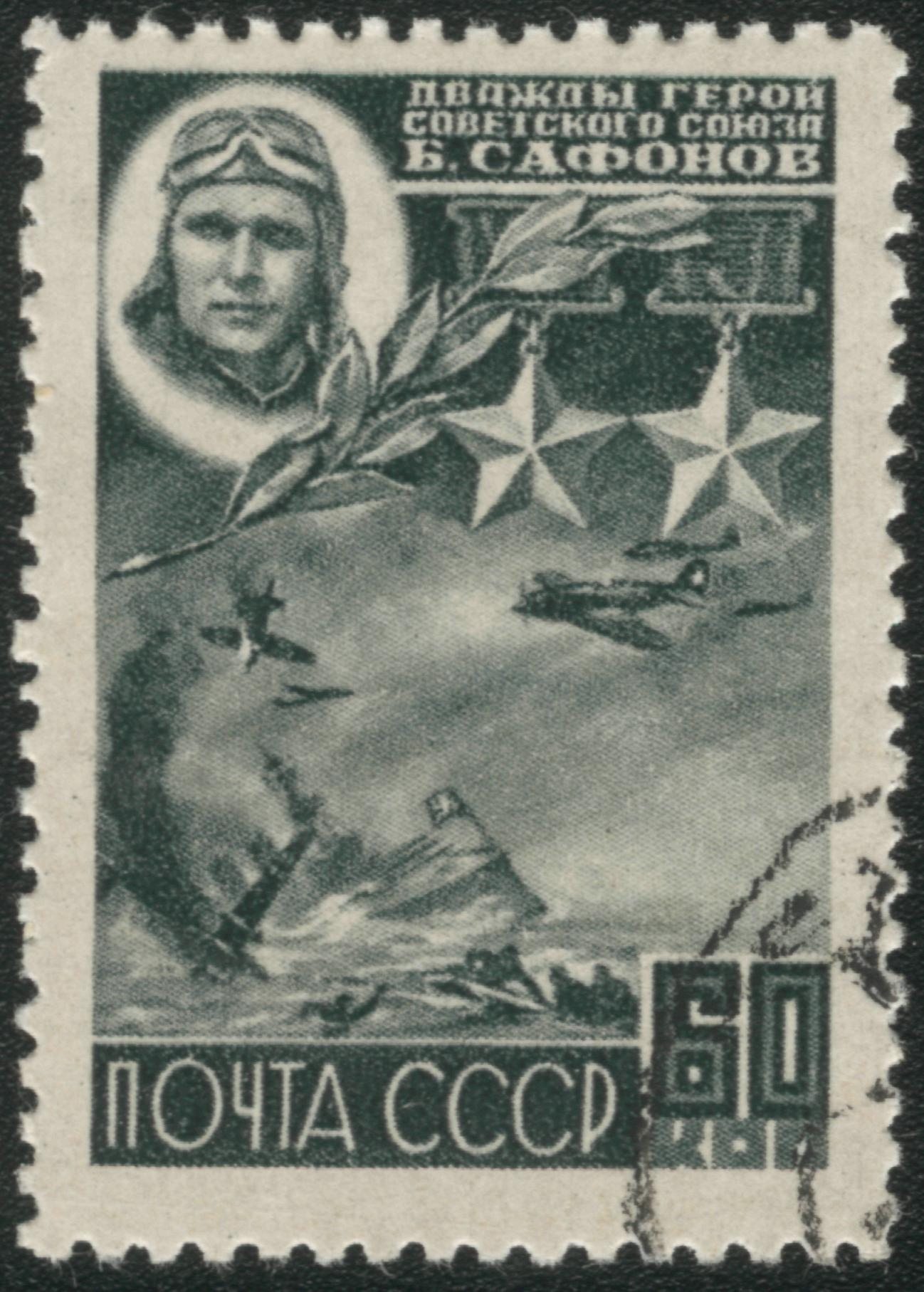
A Soviet postage stamp issued in 1944, showing Safonov, his medals and an imagined combat scene.

Safonovo, a village in the Severomorsk administrative area, is named after Safonov and has a bust of him at the entrance to the settlement. The street where he lived in Severomorsk is also named after him and his former home has a commemorative plaque attached. One of his I-16 aircraft is displayed in the Central Naval Museum in Saint Petersburg. An annual prize for the best naval pilot is also named after him. Safonov's last regiment was renamed Red Banner, Safonov's Second Guards Fighter Aviation Regiment in his honour.

== Bibliography ==
- Carter, Eric and Loveless, Antony (2014) Force Benedict, Hodder & Stoughton, ISBN 978-1-44478514-2
- Maslov, Mikhail (2010). Polikarpov I-15, I-16 and I-153 Aces. Bloomsbury Publishing. ISBN 9781846039829.
- Mellinger, George (2006). Soviet lend-lease fighter aces of World War 2. Oxford: Osprey. ISBN 9781846030413. OCLC 70672584.
- Morgan, Hugh (2013). Soviet Aces of World War 2. Bloomsbury Publishing. ISBN 9781472800572. OCLC 869378852.
- Morgan, Stephen (1997). Soviet aces, 1939-45. London: Osprey Aerospace. ISBN 1855326329. OCLC 38470731.
- Simonov, Andrey; Chudinova, Svetlana (2017). Женщины - Герои Советского Союза и России. Moscow: Russian Knights Foundation, Museum of Technology V. Zadorozhny. ISBN 9785990960701. OCLC 1019634607.
- Simonov, Andrey; Bodrikhin, Nikolai (2017). Боевые лётчики--дважды и трижды Герои Советского Союза [Combat pilots - twice and thrice Heroes of the Soviet Union] (in Russian). Moskva: Russkie Viti︠a︡zi. ISBN 978-5-9909605-1-0.
