= Sukhoi Su-33 =

Soviet/Russian carrier-based fighter

Su-33
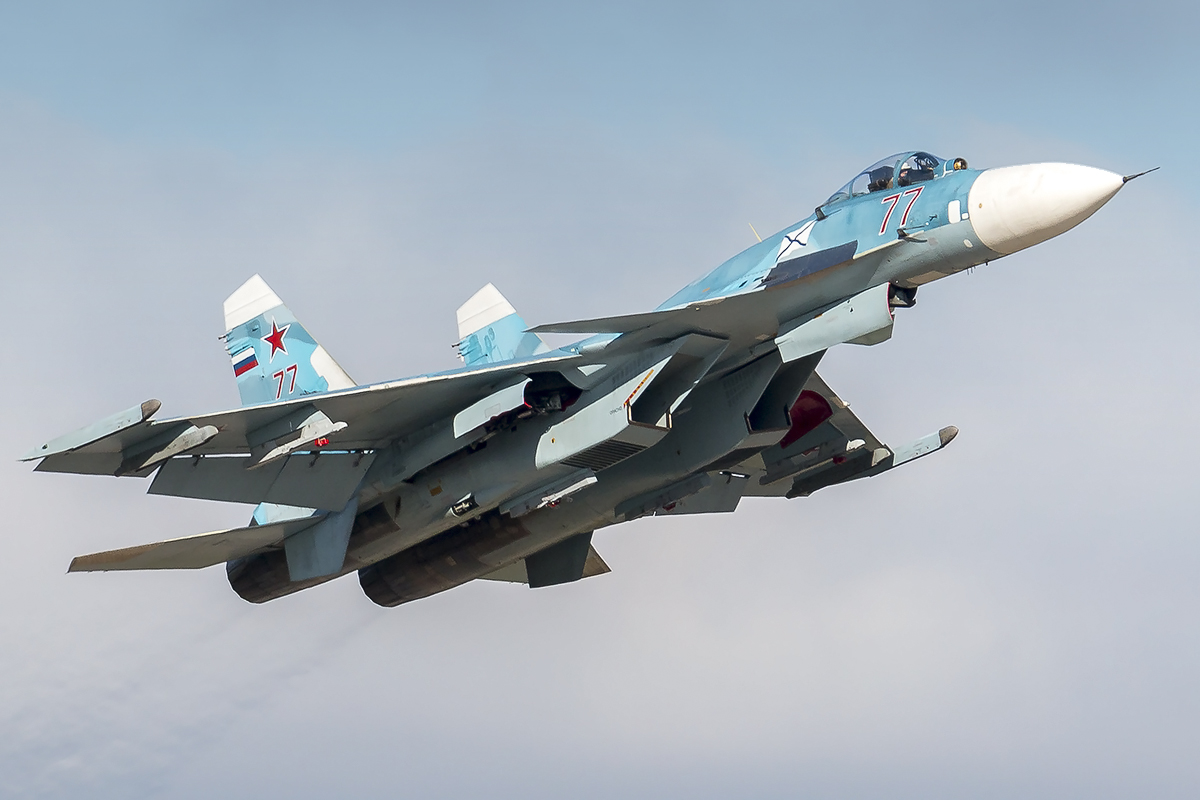
- A Russian Navy Sukhoi Su-33

General information
- Type: Carrier-based air superiority fighter with multirole capabilities
- National origin: Soviet Union; Russia
- Manufacturer: Sukhoi, Komsomolsk-on-Amur Aircraft Production Association
- Status: In service
- Primary user: Russian Navy
- Number built: 24 built total

History
- Manufactured: 1987–1999
- Introduction date: 31 August 1998 (official)
- First flight: 17 August 1987; 39 years ago
- Developed from: Sukhoi Su-27
- Variant: Shenyang J-15

The Sukhoi Su-33 (Russian: Сухой Су-33; NATO reporting name: Flanker-D) is a Soviet/Russian all-weather carrier-based twin-engine air superiority-focused multirole fighter designed by Sukhoi and manufactured by Komsomolsk-on-Amur Aircraft Production Association. Derived from the Su-27 and initially known as the Su-27K, compared with its parent design the Su-33 has a number of modifications to make it suitable for carrier operations. These include a strengthened undercarriage and airframe, larger, folding wings and stabilators, new canards, upgraded engines, and a twin nose wheel.

First used in operations in 1995 aboard the aircraft carrier Admiral Kuznetsov, (Note: Officially, Admiral Kuznetsov is referred to as a "heavy aircraft-carrying cruiser" due to her heavy surface-to-surface and surface-to-air armament, as well as a way around an international treaty prohibiting aircraft carriers from sailing through the straits of the Bosporus and the Dardanelles.) the fighter officially entered service in August 1998, by which time the designation "Su-33" was used. Following the break-up of the Soviet Union and the subsequent downsizing of the Russian Navy, only 24 aircraft were produced. Attempted sales to China and India were unsuccessful. With plans to retire the Su-33 once they reach the end of their service life, the Russian Navy ordered the MiG-29K as a replacement in 2009.

== Development ==
=== Background and origins ===
During the 1970s, the Yakovlev Yak-38, then the Soviet Navy's only operational carrier-based fixed-wing combat aircraft, was found to be unable to undertake its role due to limited range and payload, which severely hampered the capability of the Soviet Navy's Project 1143 carriers. It was decided to develop a bigger and more potent carrier capable of operating STOL aircraft. During the assessment period, a number of aircraft carriers were studied; the Project 1160 carrier would have been able to operate the MiG-23s and Su-24s, but was abandoned due to budget constraints. Design efforts were then concentrated on the Project 1153 carrier, which would have accommodated the Su-25s and the proposed MiG-23Ks and Su-27Ks. Sufficient funding was not secured, and the Navy looked at the possibility of a fifth, and larger, Project 1143 carrier, modified to allow for Yak-141, MiG-29K and Su-27K operations.

To prepare for the operations of the Su-27K and the rival MiG-29K on board the new carrier, work proceeded on the development of the steam catapult, arresting gear, optical and radio landing systems. The pilots were trained at a new establishment in Crimea, named NITKA, for Aviation Research and Training Complex. In 1981, the Soviet government ordered the abandonment of the catapult system as part of an overall downsize of Project 1143.5 carriers, which also included cancelling the fifth Project 1143 carrier and Varyag. A takeoff ramp was installed at the complex, where takeoffs would be executed to ensure that the Su-27Ks and MiG-29Ks would be able to operate from carriers. Both Sukhoi and Mikoyan modified their prototypes to validate the takeoff ramp. Three Sukhoi T10s (−3, −24 and −25), along with an Su-27UB, were used for takeoffs from the simulated ramp. The first of these tests were undertaken by Nikolai Sadovnikov on 28 August 1982. Flight tests indicated the need for a change in ramp design, and it was modified to a ski-jump profile.

Conceptual designs of the Su-27K commenced in 1978. On 18 April 1984, the Soviet government instructed Sukhoi to develop an air defence fighter; Mikoyan was ordered to build a lighter multirole fighter. Full-scale design of the Su-27K soon started as the "T-10K" under the guidance of Konstantin Marbyshev. Nikolai Sadovnikov was appointed the design bureau's Chief Test Pilot for the programme. By November 1984, conceptual design had passed its critical design review, with the detailed design finalised in 1986. The two prototypes were constructed in conjunction with KnAAPO in 1986–1987.

=== Testing ===
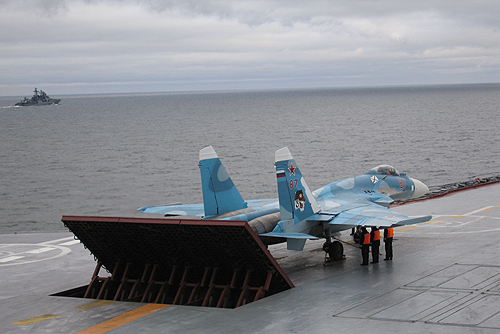
A Su-33 preparing to take off from Admiral Kuznetsov in the Barents Sea, during a visit by Russian president Dmitry Medvedev

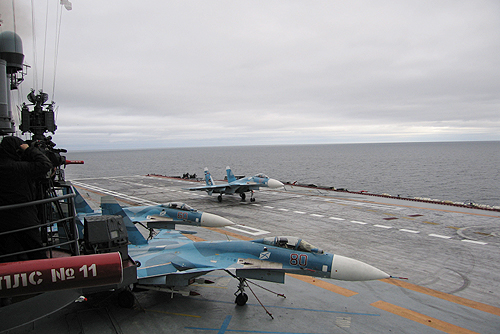
A Su-33 landing aboard the Admiral Kuznetsov aircraft carrier

The first Su-27K prototype, piloted by Viktor Pugachyov, made its maiden flight on 17 August 1987 at the NITKA facility; the second followed on 22 December. Flight tests continued at NITKA, where Su-27Ks and MiG-29Ks demonstrated and validated the feasibility of ski-jump operations. The pilots also practised no-flare landings before making an actual landing on a carrier deck. It was another two years before Tbilisi, subsequently renamed Admiral Kuznetsov, left the shipyard.

Viktor Pugachyov, piloting the second Su-27K, became the first Russian to conventionally land aboard an aircraft carrier on 1 November 1989. It was found that the carrier's jet blast deflectors were too close to the engine nozzles when raised at an angle of 60°; thus an improvised solution held the deflectors at 45°. However, when the aircraft was in front of it for longer than the maximum six seconds, the shield's water pipes exploded. The pilot, Pugachyov, reduced engine throttle, accidentally causing the detents (blocks used to restrain aircraft from accelerating) to retract and the fighter to move forwards. The aircraft was quickly stopped; Pugachyov later took off without the use of blast deflectors or detents. Since then, a Kamov Ka-27PS search-and-rescue helicopter was flown close to the carrier in case of an accident.

During the following three-week period, 227 sorties were amassed, along with 35 deck landings. Flight testing continued afterwards, and on 26 September 1991, naval pilots began testing the Su-27K; by 1994, it had successfully passed the State Acceptance Trials. During 1990–1991, seven production aircraft were rolled out.

=== Further developments ===
The first of two known versions of the Su-33, the twin-seat Su-33UB, made its first flight in April 1999. The aircraft, piloted by Viktor Pugachyov and Sergey Melnikov, flew for 40 minutes near Ramenskoye Airport. The Su-33UB (Initially named as Su-27KUB, "Korabelny Uchebno-Boevoy", or "carrier combat trainer") was planned to be a trainer, but with the potential to fill other roles. Notable improvements over the Su-33 included a revised forward fuselage and leading edge slats, bigger wings and stabilators.

=== Modernization ===
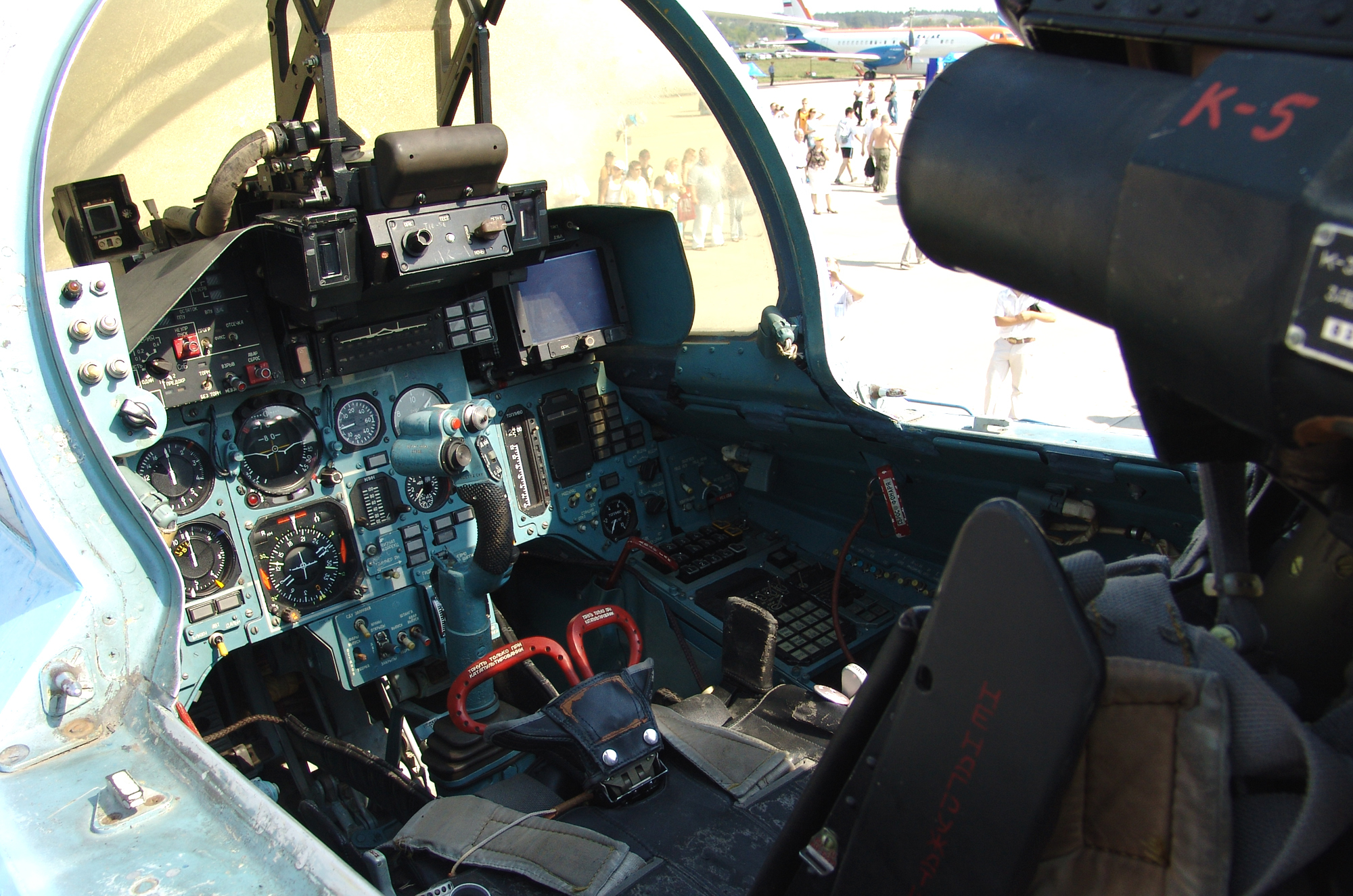
Cockpit of Sukhoi Su-33.

In 2010, Sukhoi developed an upgraded version of the Su-33; flight trials began in October 2010. This modernized Su-33 was to compete with a potential Chinese indigenous version of the original Su-33, the Shenyang J-15, and to encourage orders from the Russian Navy. Major upgrades to the aircraft included more powerful (132 kN, 29,800 lbf) AL-31-F-M1 engines and a larger weapons carriage; upgrades to the radar and weapons were not possible at the time due to funding constraints. According to military author Richard Fisher, it has been speculated that further modifications to a new production batch would include a phased-array radar, thrust vectoring nozzles, and long-range anti-ship missiles.

In September 2016, it was announced the Su-33 will be outfitted with new sighting and computing system SVP-24 from the Russian company Gefest & T, that will allow the aircraft to use unguided bombs with a similar precision as guided ones, giving it an ability of a strike fighter. The SVP-24 takes into account data such as current plane's location together with flight parameters, target data and environmental parameters and determines the optimal trajectory for unguided ammunition. It is believed, the installation of modern targeting systems will increase the capability of the Su-33 fighters close to Su-30SM level.

The second stage of the modernization is to include installation of more powerful engines and detection systems, according to Naval Aviation Chief Major-General Igor Kozhin.

== Design ==
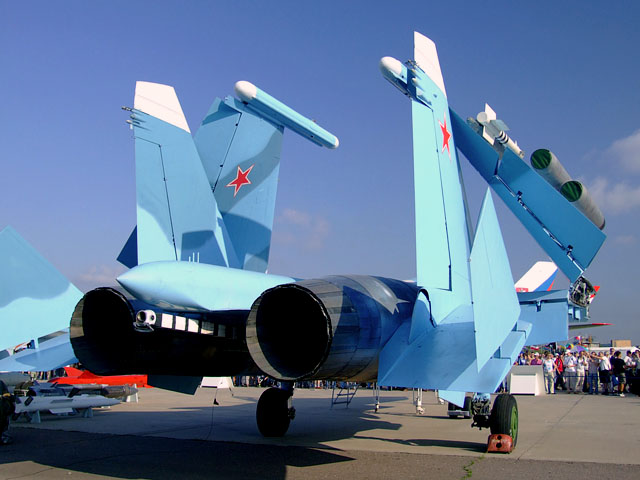
Rear/starboard view of Su-33 with its arrestor hook visible under the shortened tail "stinger"

To adapt the original Su-27 for naval operations, Sukhoi first incorporated a reinforced structure and undercarriage to withstand the great stress experienced upon landing, particularly quick descents and non-flare landings (landings where the aircraft does not 'float' and slow its descent rate just prior to touchdown). The leading edge slats, flaperons and other control surfaces are enlarged to provide increased lift and manoeuvrability at low speeds, although the wingspan remains unchanged. The wings feature double-slotted flaps and outboard drooping ailerons; in total, the refinements enlarge the wing area by 10–12%. The wings and stabilators are modified for folding to maximise the number of aircraft the carrier can accommodate and to allow ease of movement on deck. The aircraft is outfitted with more powerful turbofan engines to increase thrust-to-weight ratio, as well as an in-flight refuelling probe. The Su-33 sports canards that shorten the take-off distance and improve manoeuvrability, but have required reshaping of the leading edge root extensions (LERX). The rear radome is shortened and reshaped to prevent its striking the deck during high-Alpha (angle of attack) landings.

Compared with the rival MiG-29K, the Su-33's maximum takeoff weight (MTOW) is 50% higher; fuel capacity is more than double, allowing it to fly 80% further at altitude (or 33% at sea level). The MiG-29K can spend as much time as the Su-33 on station by using external fuel tanks, but this limits its ordnance capacity. The Su-33 can fly at speeds as low as 240 km/h (150 mph), in comparison the MiG-29K needs to maintain a minimum of 250 km/h (160 mph) for effective control. However, the MiG-29K carries more air-to-ground munitions than the Su-33. The Su-33 is more expensive and physically larger than the MiG-29K, limiting the numbers able to be deployed on an aircraft carrier. (Note: Aviation authors Bill Gunston and Yefim Gordon characterised the rejection of the MiG-29K for the Su-33 as "astonishing", noting that the Su-33 was more expensive and incapable of launching missiles against surface targets. However, some analysts stated the view that the MiG-29K was only a fall-back option if the Su-33 had proven to be too heavy for carrier operations; and that the Soviet Navy was only interested in fleet air defence, not strike or attack capabilities.)

The Su-33 carries guided missiles such as the R-73 (four) and R-27E (six) on twelve hardpoints, supplemented by the 150-round 30 mm GSh-30-1. It can carry an assortment of unguided rockets, bombs and cluster bombs for secondary air-to-ground missions. The aircraft can be used in both night and day operations at sea. The radar used, "Slot Back", has been speculated to have poor multi-target tracking, making the Su-33 reliant on other radar platforms and airborne warning and control system (AWACS) aircraft like the Kamov Ka-31 early-warning helicopter. The R-27EM missiles have the capability to intercept anti-ship missiles. The infra-red search and track (IRST) system is placed to provide better downward visibility.

== Operational history ==
=== Soviet Union and Russia ===
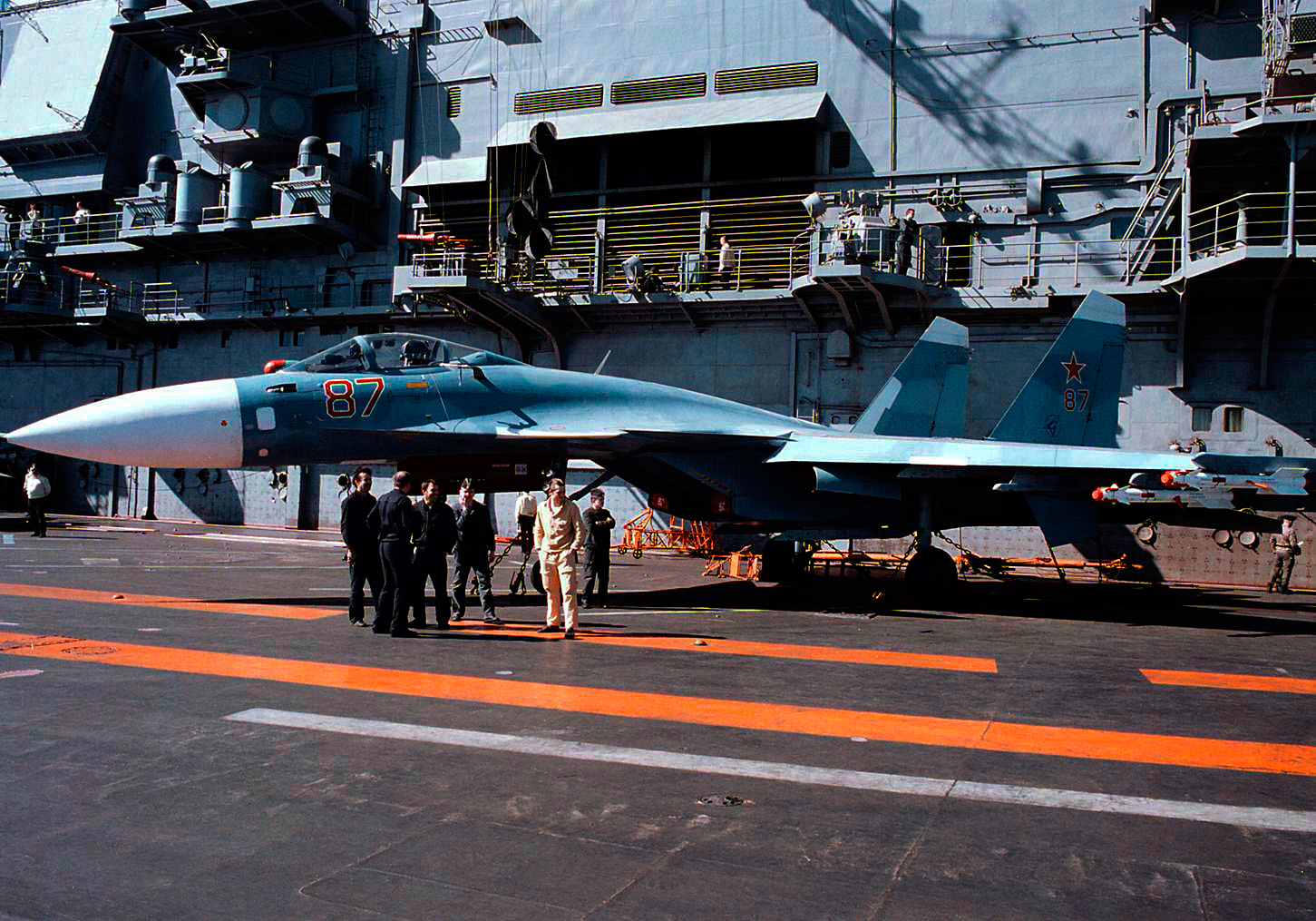
A Su-27K onboard Admiral Kuznetsov in 1996. U.S. Navy sailors from USS San Jacinto are visiting the carrier.

With the break-up of the Soviet Union, the Russian Navy was dramatically downsized, with many shipbuilding programmes stopped. If the Varyag, Oryol and Ulyanovsk had been commissioned, a total of 72 production airframes would have been built; the early-airborne warning and MiG-29K would also have proceeded, instead of being abandoned. Only 24 examples were built at the time Varyag was sold to China.

The Su-27K was introduced in the mid-1990s and from December 1995 to March 1996, Admiral Kuznetsov set sail in the Mediterranean Sea, carrying two Su-25UTGs, nine Ka-27s, and 13 Su-27Ks. The aircraft officially entered service on 31 August 1998 under new designation "Su-33". The 279th independent Shipborne Assault Aviation Regiment based at Severomorsk-3 air base became the first unit operating the variant.

In 2009, it was announced the Russian Navy will procure 24 MiG-29Ks to replace its fleet of about 19 Su-33s in service, with deliveries to be completed by 2015. However, in 2015, Chief of the Naval Aviation General Major Igor Kozhin, announced that a second fighter regiment would be formed to augment the current force, with the MiG-29Ks to be used by the new unit. The existing 19 Su-33s were to be refurbished for further use. In September 2016, at least six Su-33s were upgraded with the SVP-24 targeting system as the aircraft were preparing for their combat deployment to Syria.

In 2017, the United Engine Corporation announced it has resumed the production of upgraded AL-31F series 3 engines for all remaining 18 Su-33 fighters. The first batch of engines was delivered to the customer the same year.

==== 2015 Russian military intervention in Syria ====
Pilots of the Russian Naval Aviation returning to the Severomorsk-3 air base after the Syrian operations

On 15 November 2016, in the course of Russia's large-scale military operations against terrorist groups in Syria, Su-33s operated from the Admiral Kuznetsov aircraft carrier in the type's first combat employment, striking ISIL and Al-Nusra terrorist facilities in Syria's Idlib and Homs provinces with 500 kg precision ammunition. The main targets were ammunition warehouses, gathering and training centers and weapon production plants. According to the Russian Defence Ministry, at least 30 militants including three field commanders were killed due to the strikes.

On 5 December 2016, a Su-33 crashed into the Mediterranean Sea after the arrestor cable snapped during the aircraft's second landing attempt on board the aircraft carrier. The pilot managed to eject and survived without injuries.

=== Failed bids ===
Internationally, the People’s Republic of China was identified as a possible export customer. Russia's state weapons exporter, Rosoboronexport, was previously negotiating an order of 50 aircraft totalling US$2.5 billion. China would have initially acquired two aircraft worth $100 million for testing and then have further options to acquire an additional 12–48 aircraft. The fighters were intended to be used with the fledgling Chinese aircraft carrier programme, with the former Soviet carrier Varyag as the centrepiece.

At the sixth Zhuhai Airshow in late 2006, Lieutenant General Aleksander Denisov publicly confirmed at a news conference that China had approached Russia for the possible purchase of Su-33s, and negotiations were to start in 2007. On 1 November 2006, the Xinhua News Agency published the information on its military website that China planned to introduce the Su-33. China had previously obtained a manufacturing license for Su-27 production.

Sukhoi is working on a more advanced version, the Su-33K, a development to integrate the advanced technologies of the Su-35 fighters into the older Su-33 airframe. However, worries over other Chinese intentions emerged when it was reported that China had acquired one of the T-10Ks, a Su-33 prototype, from Ukraine, potentially to study and reverse engineer a domestic version. Various aircraft are alleged to have originated partially from the Su-33, such as the Shenyang J-15. Photos of Shenyang aircraft designers posing in front of a T-10K carrier based fighter prototype strongly suggest that the J-15 is directly related to T-10K. Negotiations stagnated as the Shenyang Aircraft company sought to reduce Russian content in the aircraft, while Sukhoi wanted to ensure a level of income from future upgrades and modifications made to the J-11.

India was also viewed as another potential operator of the Su-33. The Indian Navy planned to acquire the Su-33 for its aircraft carrier, INS Vikramaditya, the refurbished Soviet Admiral Gorshkov, which was sold to India in 2004. In the end, the rival MiG-29K was opted for, because of the Su-33's outdated avionics. The size of the Su-33 reportedly led to concerns over potential difficulties in operating it off the Indian carriers, a constraint not shared by the smaller MiG-29K.

== Variants ==
Su-27K
Carrier-based version of the Su-27 designed for Project 1143.5 and Project 1160 aircraft carriers (heavy aircraft cruisers in Soviet classification).
Su-27KI
Project of a carrier-based version of the Su-27 designed for Project 1143.5 and Project 1153 aircraft carriers (heavy aircraft cruisers in Soviet classification).
Su-27KPP
Project of a two-seat carrier-based electronic-warfare aircraft.
Su-27KRS
Project of a two-seat carrier-based reconnaissance and target designation aircraft.
Su-27KT/Su-27KTZ
Project of a carrier-based tanker aircraft.
Su-27KU
Project of a two-seat carrier-based trainer.
Su-27KSH
Project of a carrier-based attack aircraft.
Su-28K
Project of a two-seat carrier-based attack aircraft.
Su-28KRS
Project of a carrier-based reconnaissance and target designation aircraft based on the Su-28K.
Su-29K
Project of a carrier-based interceptor aircraft with a possibility to carry the long-range R-33 air-to-air missiles.
Su-33
Designation for the Su-27K after its introduction into service with the Russian Naval Aviation on 31 August 1998.
Su-27KUB/Su-33UB/Su-33D
Two-seat training-and-combat version based on the Su-27K and Su-27KU with side-by-side seating for crew of two. One prototype built.

== Operators ==
Russia

- Russian Navy – 40+ Su-33 in service as of 2022
  - Russian Naval Aviation
    - 279th Shipborne Assault Aviation Regiment – Severomorsk-3 (air base), Murmansk Oblast

== Notable accidents ==
- 17 July 2001: a Russian Navy Su-33 crashed during an air show in Russia's Pskov Region. The pilot, Major-General Timur Apakidze, died in the crash.
- 5 September 2005: a Russian Navy Su-33's arresting cable broke after a landing on Admiral Kuznetsov in the Northern Atlantic at high speed. The pilot ejected and was recovered. The plane was initially planned to be destroyed with depth charges to prevent the recovery of classified equipment. However, this did not take place as the aircraft did not carry sensitive equipment. The crash was captured on video.
- 3 December 2016: A Su-33 based on Admiral Kuznetsov crashed while making a second landing attempt after a combat sortie over Syria. The pilot survived without injuries and was immediately recovered by search and rescue teams. According to the Russian Ministry of Defence, the plane was lost after an arresting cable snapped. Afterwards, the Russian Navy transferred the carrier's remaining aircraft to an air base in Syria to continue operations while the carrier's issue was resolved.

== Aircraft on display ==
- Su-33 "70 red" on display at Komsomolsk-on-Amur Aircraft Plant in Komsomolsk-on-Amur.
- Su-33 on display at Sukhoi Design Bureau in Moscow.

== Specifications ==
Data from KnAAPO, Sukhoi, airforce-technology.com, Gordon and Davison, Williams,

General characteristics

- Crew: 1
- Length: 21.19 m (69 ft 6 in)
- Wingspan: 14.7 m (48 ft 3 in)
- Width: 7.40 m (24 ft 3 in) wing folded
- Height: 5.93 m (19 ft 5 in)
- Wing area: 67.84 m^{2} (730.2 sq ft)
- Empty weight: 18,400 kg (40,565 lb)
- Gross weight: 29,940 kg (66,006 lb)
- Max takeoff weight: 33,000 kg (72,753 lb)
- Fuel capacity: 9,500 kg (20,900 lb) internal
- Powerplant: 2 × Saturn AL-31F3 afterburning turbofan engines, 74.5 kN (16,700 lbf) thrust each dry, 125.5 kN (28,200 lbf) with afterburner

Performance

- Maximum speed: 2,300 km/h (1,430 mph, 1,240 kn) at 10,000 m (33,000 ft)
- Maximum speed: Mach 2.17
- Stall speed: 240 km/h (150 mph, 130 kn)
- Range: 3,000 km (1,900 mi, 1,600 nmi)
- Service ceiling: 17,000 m (56,000 ft)
- g limits: +8
- Rate of climb: 246 m/s (48,400 ft/min)
- Wing loading: 483 kg/m^{2} (99 lb/sq ft)
- Thrust/weight: 0.83
- Landing speed: 240 km/h (150 mph; 130 kn)

Armament

- Guns: 1 × 30 mm Gryazev-Shipunov GSh-30-1 autocannon with 150 rounds
- Hardpoints: 12 × external hardpoints with a capacity of up to 6,500 kg (14,300 lb) of ordnance, with provisions to carry combinations of:
  - Rockets:
    - S-8KOM/BM/OM
    - S-13T/OF
    - S-25OFM-PU
  - Missiles:
    - Air-to-air missiles:
      - 8 × R-27R/ER/T/ET/E
      - 4 × R-73E
    - Anti-ship missiles:
      - Kh-31A
      - Kh-41
    - Anti-radiation missiles:
      - Kh-25MP
      - Kh-31P
  - Bombs:
    - RBK-500 cluster bomb
    - Up to 500 kg (1,100 lb) bombs

Avionics

- N001 radar
- OEPS-27 electro-optical targeting system
- SVP-24 munitions guidance system
- SPO-15 Radar Warning Receiver

== Gallery ==
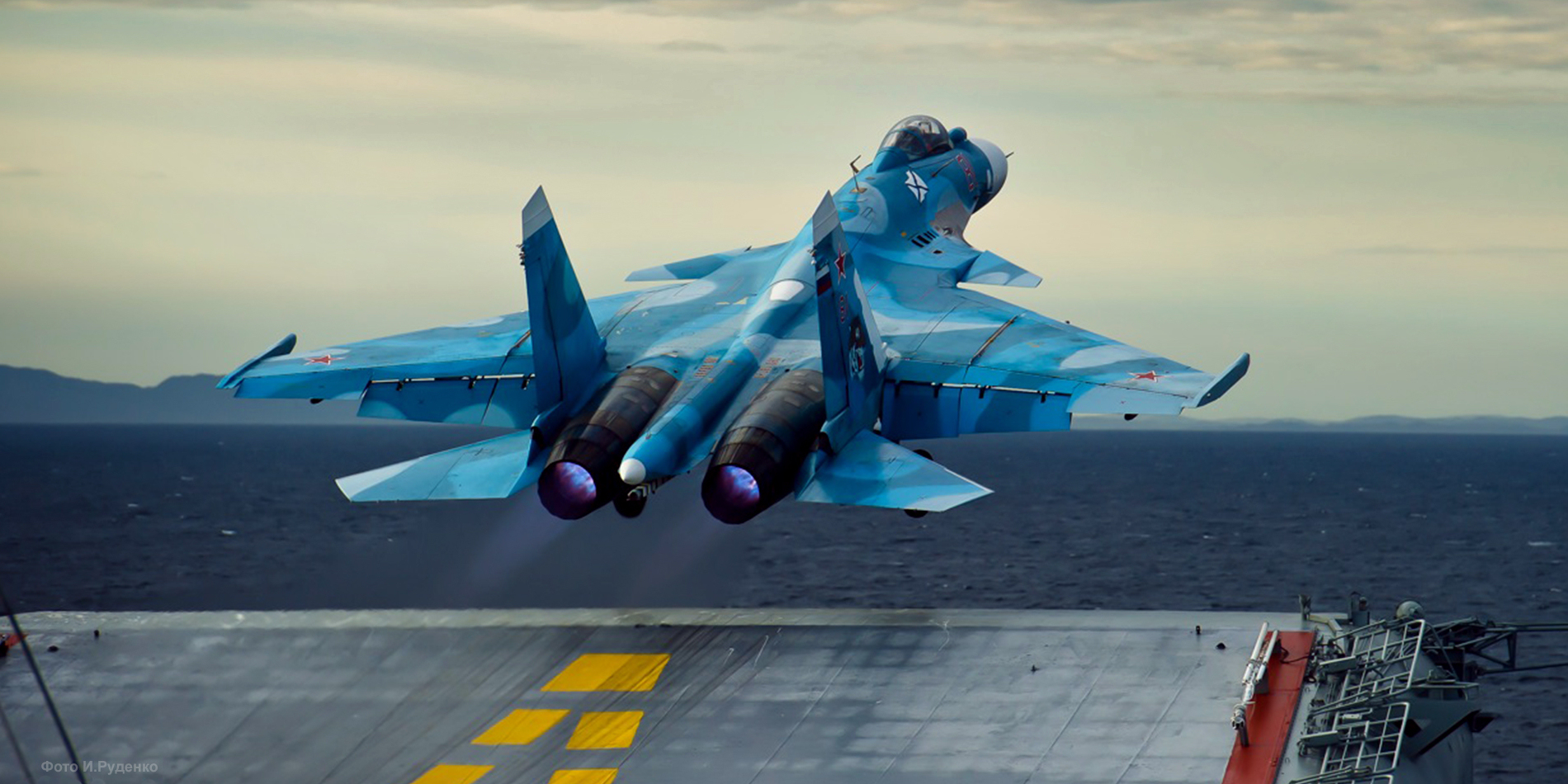
Sukhoi Su-33 launching from the Admiral Kuznetsov

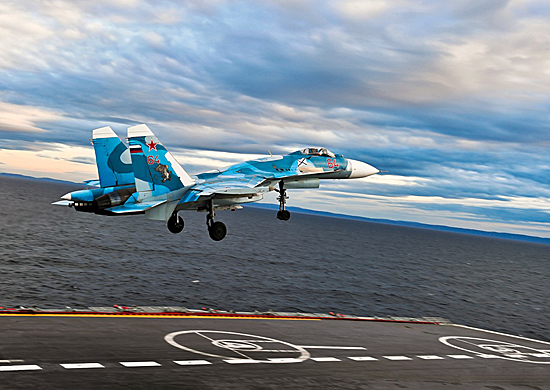
Su-33 taking off from the Admiral Kuznetsov aircraft carrier

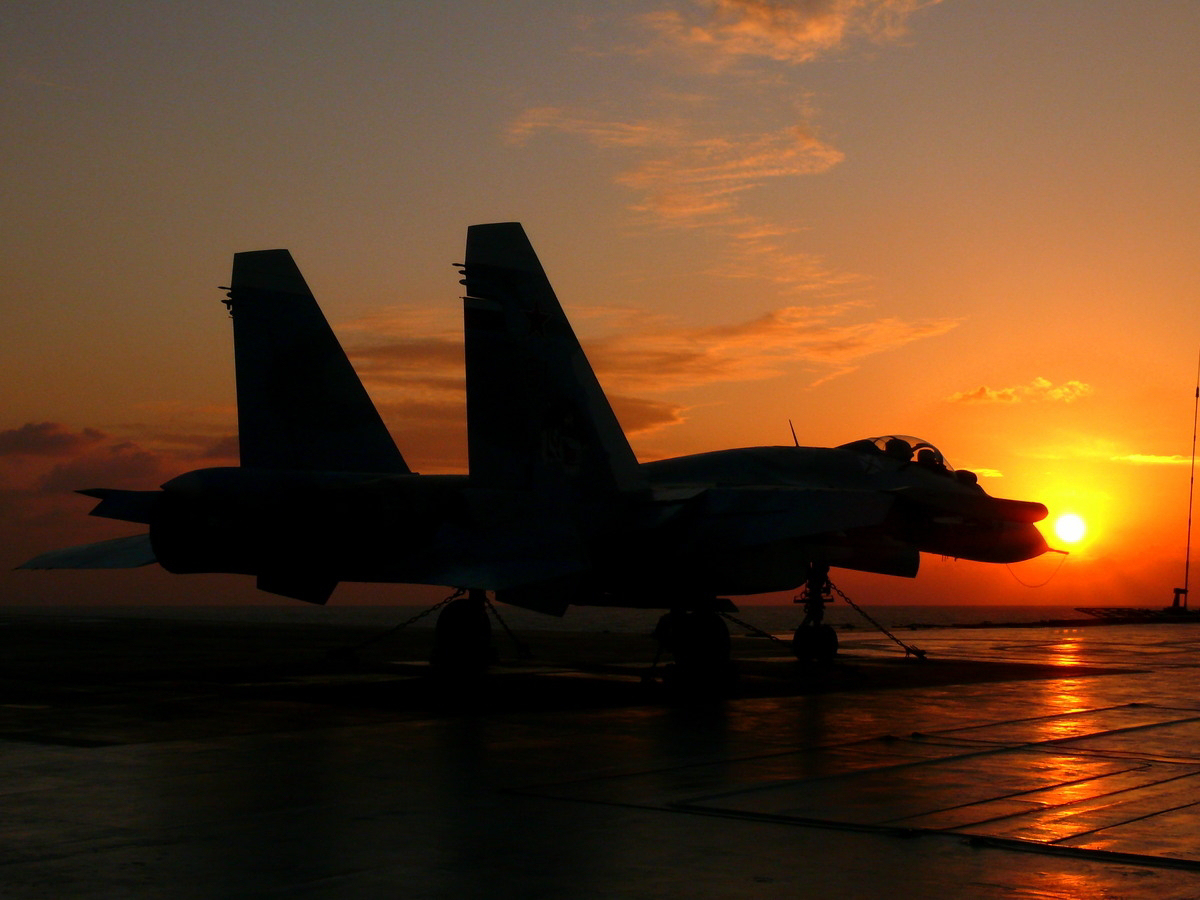
Shadow of the Su-33

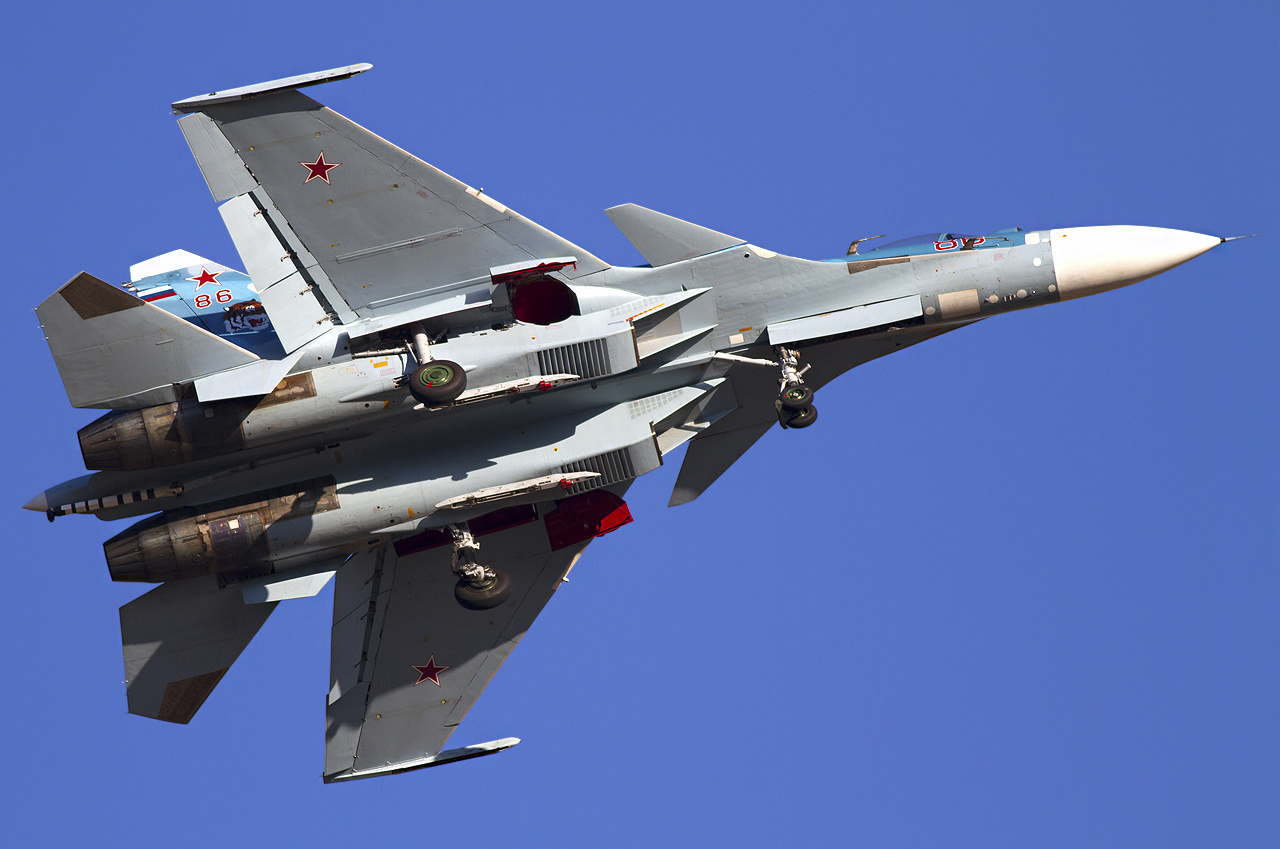
Lower side of the Su-33

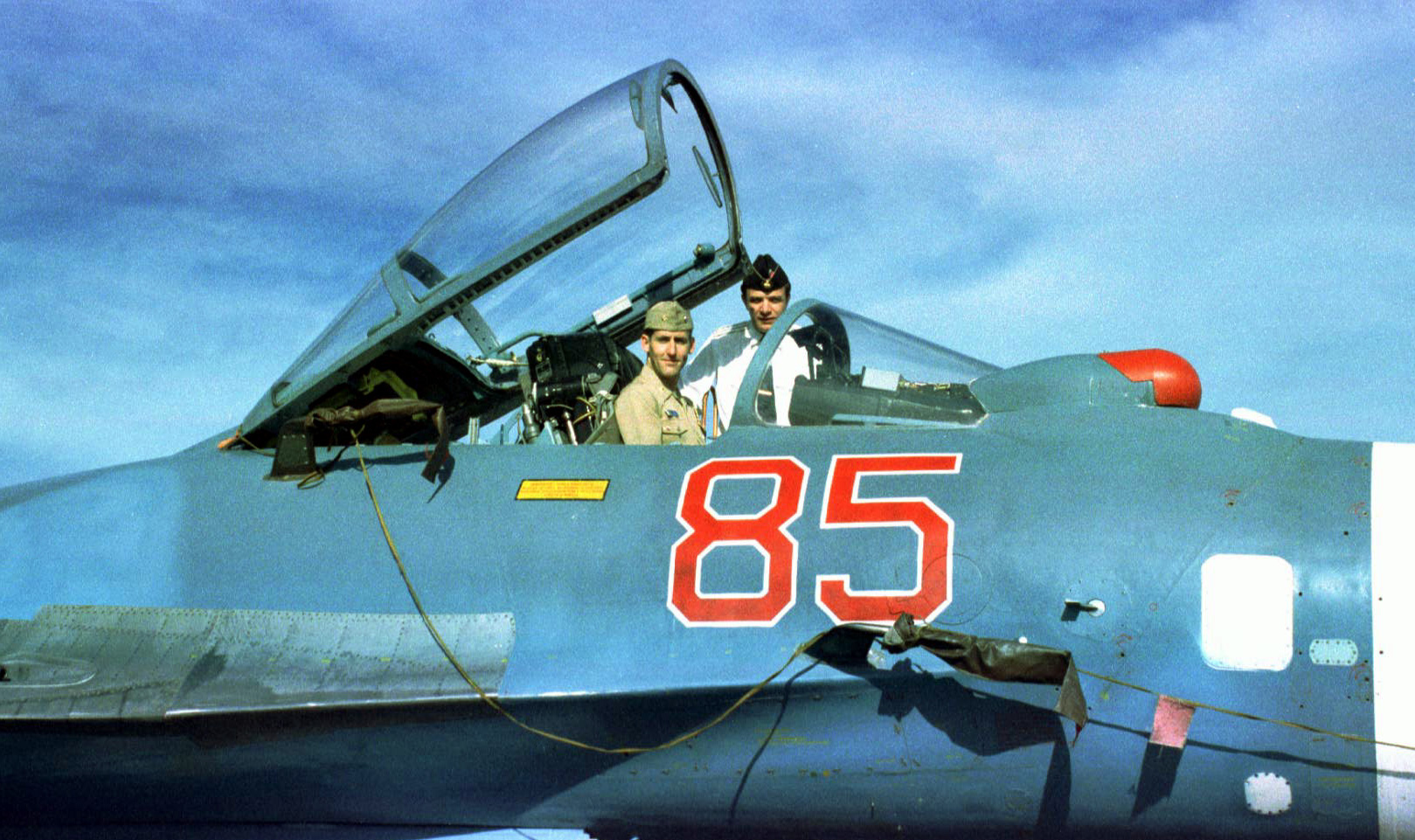
Russian Navy officer explains his aircraft to a visiting U.S. Navy officer on the flight deck of the Admiral Kuznetsov, Jan. 7, 1996

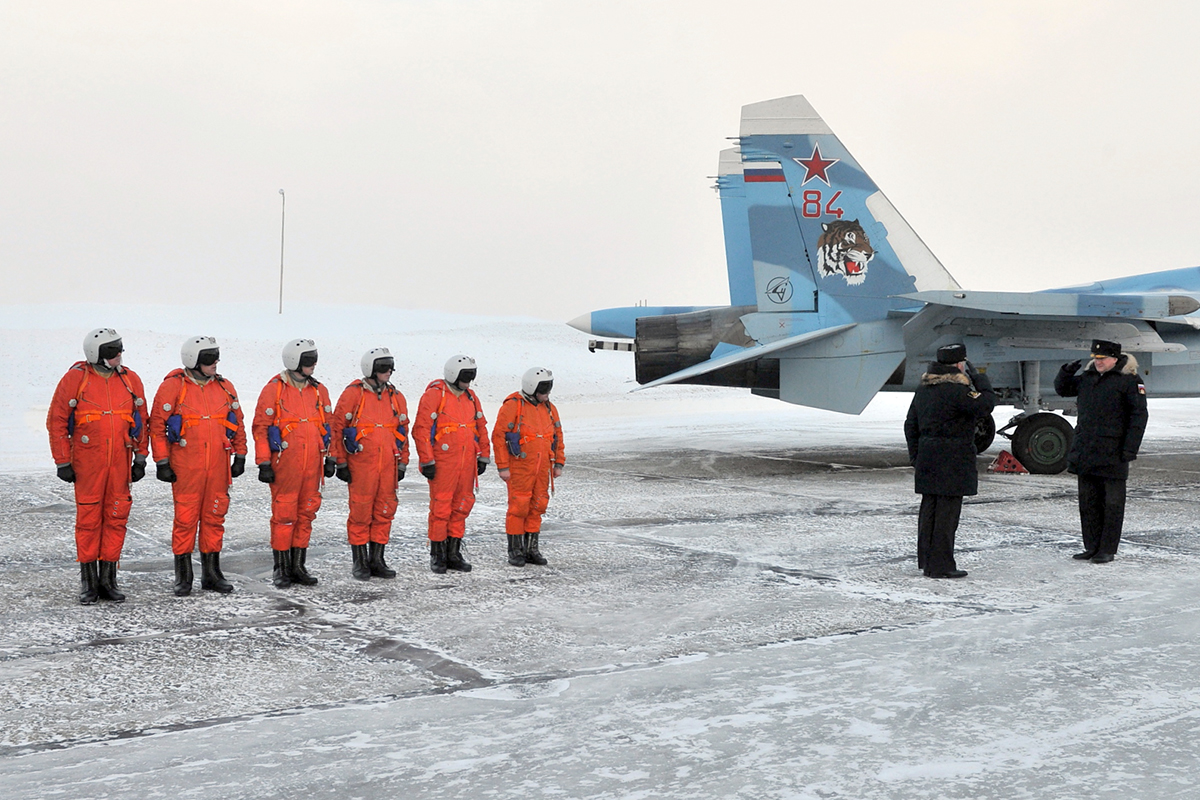
Pilots of the Su-33 during a ceremony before the flight

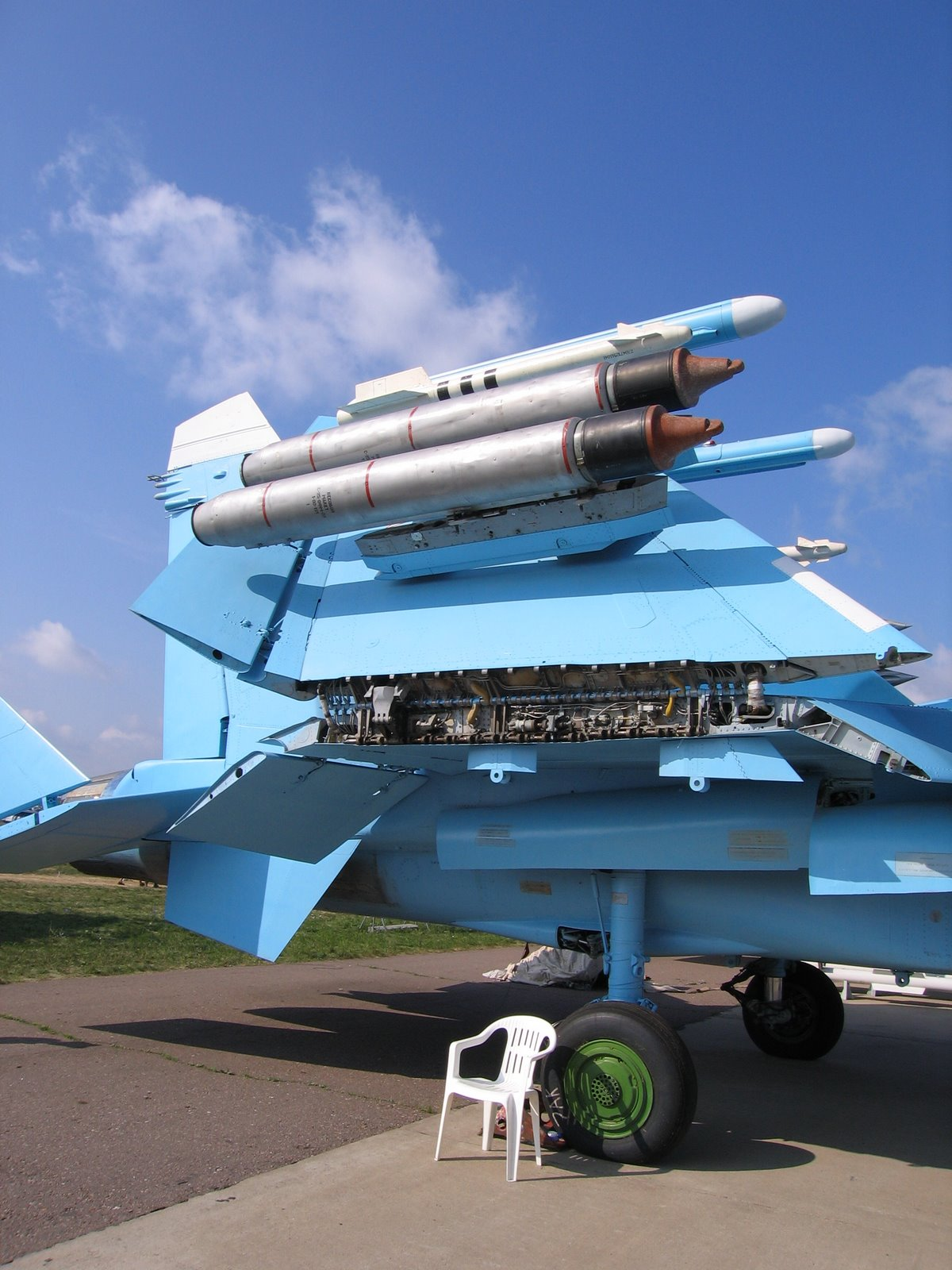
Su-33 wing folded, showing its armaments

== See also ==
Related development

- Sukhoi Su-30
- Sukhoi Su-34
- Sukhoi Su-35
- Sukhoi Su-37
- Shenyang J-15

Aircraft of comparable role, configuration, and era

- Mikoyan MiG-29K
- Dassault Rafale
- Boeing F/A-18 Hornet
- Grumman F-14 Tomcat
