= Apakidze (noble family) =

Georgian noble family

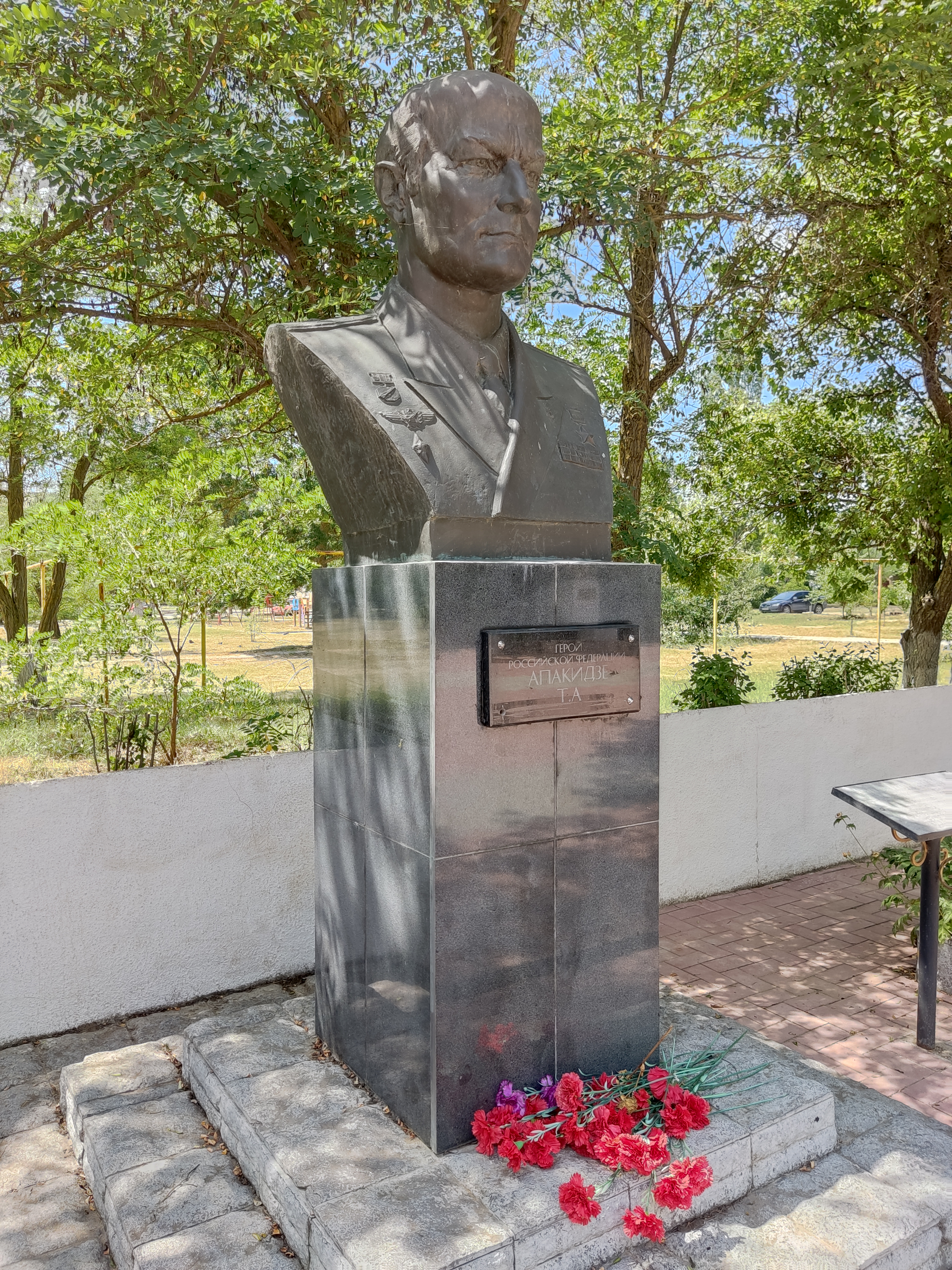
Bust of Temur Apakidze, 2022

The House of Aph'ak'idze (Georgian: აფაქიძე) is an ancient Georgian noble family dating back to the first half of the 14th century.

== History ==
According to a family legend, the Aphakidze family descend from Arp’a-Khan, "a Tatar of Genghis Khan’s times", who embraced Christianity and settled down in Abkhazia whence his descendants moved to Mingrelia where their princely title (Tavadi) was confirmed.

Members of the Aphakidze family had been vassals to the Princes Dadiani, rulers of the Principality of Mingrelia.

Displaced by the annexation of Georgia in 1801, the family established a new life within the borders of the Russian Empire. In 1867, and later in 1906, they were confirmed as princes (knyaz), making them official members of the Russian nobility.

== Notable members ==
- Temur Apakidze (1954-2021), Russian major general
