= Severomorsk-3 (rural locality) =

Severomorsk-3 Североморск-3
- Inhabited locality
- Interactive map of Severomorsk-3
- Location of Severomorsk-3 Severomorsk-3 (Murmansk Oblast)
- Coordinates: 68°55′N 33°45′E
- Country: Russia
- Federal subject: Murmansk Oblast
- Elevation: 165 m (541 ft)

Population (2010 Census)
  - Total: 2,608
  - Estimate (1989): 5,148 (+97.4%)

Administrative status
  - Subordinated to: closed administrative-territorial formation of Severomorsk

Municipal status
  - Urban okrug: Severomorsk Urban Okrug
- Time zone: UTC+3 (MSK)
- Postal code: 184676
- Dialing code: +7 81537
- OKTMO ID: 47730000106

Severomorsk-3 (Russian: Североморск-3) is a rural locality (an inhabited locality) in administrative jurisdiction of the closed administrative-territorial formation of Severomorsk in Murmansk Oblast, Russia, located on the Srednyaya River, 22 kilometers (14 mi) southeast of Severomorsk proper. As of the 2010 Census, its population was 2,608.

Severomorsk-3 Air Base and ZEVS are located next to the settlement.

== History ==
It was founded as a work settlement around 1951.
