= Severomorsk-1 =

Military airbase in Murmansk Oblast, Russia

Severomorsk-1
- Североморск-1
- Severomorsk, Murmansk Oblast in Russia
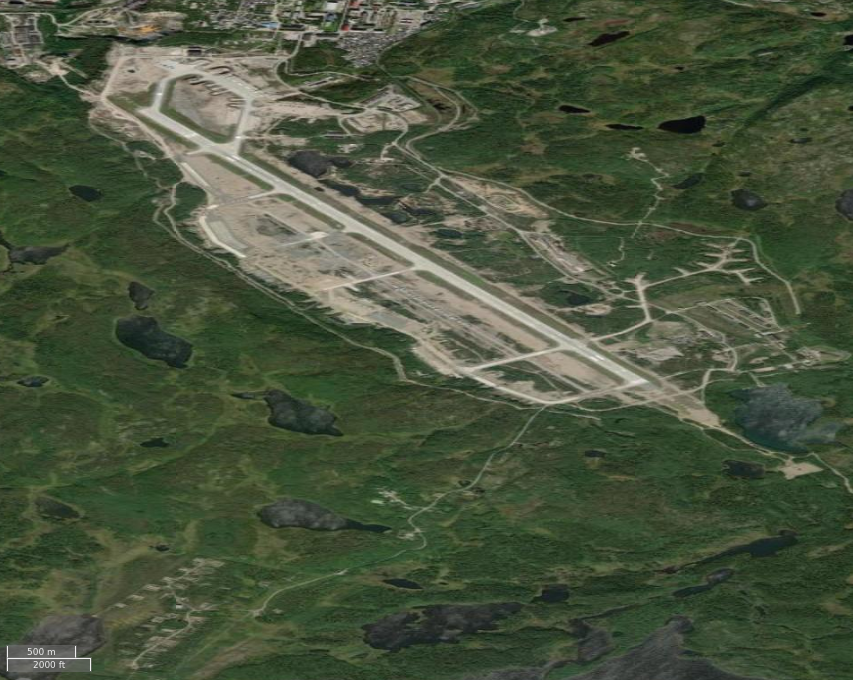
- Satellite imagery of Severomorsk-1 air base

Site information
- Type: Air Base
- Owner: Ministry of Defence
- Operator: Russian Navy - Russian Naval Aviation
- Controlled by: 45th Air and Air Defence Forces Army

Location
- Shown within Murmansk Oblast Severomorsk-1 (Russia)
- Coordinates: 69°1′54″N 33°25′6″E

Site history
- Built: 1941
- In use: 1941 - present

Airfield information
- Elevation: 73 metres (240 ft) AMSL
Runways
| Direction | Length and surface |
|---|---|
| 14/32 | Concrete |

Severomorsk-1, formerly known as Vayenga-1, is a naval air base in Murmansk Oblast, Russia 4 km (2.5 mi) south of Severomorsk (formerly called Vayenga). It one of the largest airfields on the Kola Peninsula, second only to Olenya. It can accommodate over 40 bombers and a small number of fighters.

The base is home to the 403rd Independent Composite Aviation Regiment, 830th Independent Shipborne Antisubmarine Helicopter Regiment and the 216th Independent Unmanned Aerial Vehicle Squadron.

== Second World War ==
When No. 151 Wing RAF arrived in 1941, the airfield was the base of the 72nd SAP-SF (Composite Aviation Regiment-Northern Fleet) commanded by Colonel Georgii Gubanov, part of the Northern Fleet Air Force (Major-General A. A. Kuznetsov) of the Naval Air Fleet. The 4th Squadron of the 72 SAP-SF (Captain Boris Safonov), flying Polikarpov I-16 fighters, was also based at Vaenga. The airfield had an adequate surface of compacted sand, a large oval about 4.8 km (3 mi) long, on its east-west axis. The airfield was in a bowl surrounded by hillocks and woods and was found to get very, very bumpy in wet weather. The front line was about 24 km (15 mi) to the west and the airfield facilities were almost invisible, being well dispersed, dug in and camouflaged among the hillocks and growths of silver birch. There was a tarmac road about 2 km (1 mi) long along which lay buildings but there were only cart tracks and paths linking the buildings and huts.

The airfield was under occasional attack by the Luftwaffe and Russian soldiers guarded the airfield from positions in the woods around the perimeter. With the autumn rains and the number of lorries driving people to and fro, the tracks quickly became potholed. The aircraft hangars were part-buried for camouflage but had been built for the Polikarpov I-16s and were too narrow for the Hurricanes; Russian workers appeared to widen them, working-non-stop until the enlargement was complete. Accommodation was in brick buildings and wooden huts, the huts being found to be unkempt and some infested with lice. The bedding was new, the food was ample, though some considered it to be a little greasy and the sanitation was hideous, leading to the British naming the main latrine, directly over a cesspit, "The Kremlin". Co-operation from the Russians was excellent; Isherwood established rapport with the Soviet commanding general and arranging bomber escort tactics with the local air commanders.

== Cold War ==
The following units were here at some point:

- 9th Guards Maritime Missile Aviation Regiment between 1945 and 1971.
- 1941st Maritime Torpedo Aviation Regiment during 1952.
- 991st Fighter Aviation Regiment VVS VMF during 1955.
- 392nd Independent Long-Range Reconnaissance Aviation Regiment between 1963 and 1965.
- 72nd Independent Transport Aviation Squadron

During the Cold War, the two most important aviation regiments at the base were the 967th Naval Air Reconnaissance Regiment (967 MRAP) operating Tupolev Tu-22M and Tupolev Tu-16 aircraft (1951–1993) and the 24th Independent Long Range Anti-Submarine Aviation Regiment (24 OPLAPDD) operating Ilyushin Il-38 aircraft (1971–1993). Both were directly responsible to the Northern Fleet headquarters.

After the collapse of the Soviet Union, the 146th Independent Reconnaissance Aviation Squadron was located at the base between 1993 and 1997.

== See also ==
- List of military airbases in Russia
- Severomorsk-2
- Severomorsk-3
