= Shchukozero =

Shchukozero Щукозеро
- Inhabited locality
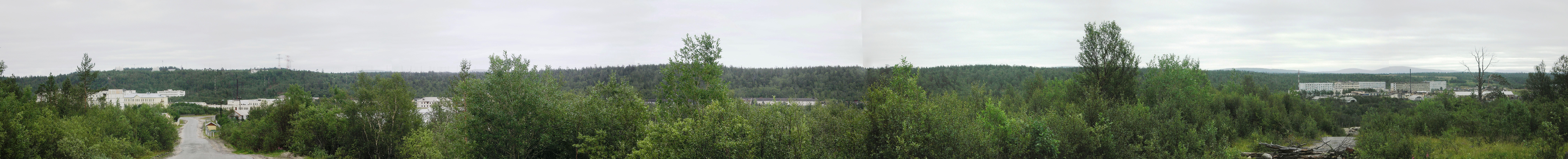
- View of Shchukozero
- Interactive map of Shchukozero
- Location of Shchukozero Shchukozero (Murmansk Oblast)
- Coordinates: 69°02′N 33°38′E
- Country: Russia
- Federal subject: Murmansk Oblast
- Elevation: 56 m (184 ft)

Population (2010 Census)
  - Total: 712
  - Estimate (2021): 522 (−26.7%)

Administrative status
  - Subordinated to: closed administrative-territorial formation of Severomorsk

Municipal status
  - Urban okrug: Severomorsk Urban Okrug
- Time zone: UTC+3 (MSK)
- Postal code: 184637
- OKTMO ID: 47730000111

Shchukozero (Russian: Щукозеро) is a rural locality (an inhabited locality) in administrative jurisdiction of the closed administrative-territorial formation of Severomorsk in Murmansk Oblast, Russia, located on the Kola Peninsula, beyond the Arctic Circle, at the height of 33 meters (108 ft) above sea level. At the 2010 Census, its population was 712.
