= Novofyodorovka, Republic of Bashkortostan =

Novofyodorovka Новофёдоровка
- Village
- Location within Bashkortostan Location within Russia
- Coordinates: 53°30′N 54°38′E
- Country: Russia
- Region: Bashkortostan
- District: Miyakinsky District
- Time zone: UTC+5:00

Novofyodorovka (Russian: Новофёдоровка) is a rural locality (a village) in Satyyevsky Selsoviet, Miyakinsky District, Bashkortostan, Russia. The population was 63 as of 2010. There are two streets.

== Geography ==
Novofyodorovka is located 24 km southwest of Kirgiz-Miyaki (the district's administrative centre) by road. Satyevo is the nearest rural locality.
