= Project 1153 Orel =

Proposed Soviet nuclear powered aircraft carrier

Class overview
- Name: Orel Class
- Builders: Chernomorsky Shipyard 444
- Operators: Soviet Navy
- Planned: 2
- Canceled: 2

History

Soviet Union
- Name: Orel (Russian: Орёл)
- Ordered: 1976
- Commissioned: 1985 (Planned)
- Fate: Work for the ship ceased in 1978 while still on the draft design

General characteristics
- Type: Aircraft carrier
- Displacement: 72.000 Tons
- Propulsion: Nuclear Reactor
- Speed: 29 knots (54 km/h)
- Range: Unlimited
- Armament: 20 × P-700 Granit AShMs; 2 × 3K95 Kinzhal SAMs; 4 × 3S90 Uragan SAMs; 12 × AK-630 CIWS; 4 × RBU-6000 and/or RBU-12000 ASW rockets
- Aircraft carried: 50 aircraft total; 34 MiG-23K strike fighters; 6 × P-42 Garpun ASW aircraft; 4 × P-42RLDN AWACS aircraft; 6 × Kamov Ka-27 scout helicopters

Project 1153 Orel (Russian: Орёл pr: "Or'yol", Eagle) was Soviet Union's planned aircraft carrier class developed in the 1970s to give the Soviet Navy a true blue water aviation capability. The vessel would have about 72,000 tons displacement, a nuclear powered propulsion system and steam catapults for aircraft launch, similar to the earlier Kitty Hawk-class supercarriers of the U.S. Navy. Unlike them and the preceding Soviet aircraft cruisers, it was also designed with a large offensive capability; the ship mounts including 20 vertical launch tubes for anti-ship cruise missiles. The Soviets classified it as a "large cruiser with aircraft armament".

== Etymology ==
The project was codenamed Eagle (Орёл), just like the two earlier helicopter and aircraft cruiser projects, and several projects of other classes of ships, were named after birds of prey. However the carriers themselves were named after Soviet cities, while only frigates were named after birds (see Russian ship naming conventions); the actual projected name of the ships is not known.

== History ==
The origins of the Orel program dates back to the late 1960s, when the Soviet Defense Minister Andrei Grechko sponsored a program of constructing large aircraft-carrying cruisers in response to American aircraft carriers.

The purpose of this project was to strengthen the Soviet naval aviation capabilities to allow them to operate on the high seas. In fact, the only Soviet carriers at the time, the Moskva-class, were essentially helicopter carriers, incapable of carrying fixed-wing aircraft. Thus leaving the Soviet fleet practically without air cover during operations away from the coast and severely limiting its operational capabilities.

The Project 1160 (Codenamed Orel) was projected as the first Soviet aircraft carrier powered by nuclear reactor. The development began in the early 1970s at the Nevskoye Design Bureau. The project envisaged the construction of three supercarriers with a displacement of 80.000 tons and capable of carrying about 60 carrier-based aircraft. In addition, the ship was installed with 16 P-700 Granit anti-ship missile VLS beneath the flight deck for an offensive abilities and to bypass the Montreux Convention, which forbade aircraft carriers from crossing the Dardanelles Strait. However in 1973, the work of the Project 1160 was cancelled for being too expensive.

Project 1153, (based on its predecessor Project 1160) a more V/STOL-aircraft-oriented, was developed instead. Compared to Project 1160, it is planned to have a displacement of 8.000 tons less while retaining its nuclear powered propulsion system and the VLS for anti-ship missiles. The ship was added four extra VLS, and its aircraft capacity reduced from 60 to 50. It was also planned that two ships will be constructed instead of three due to the insufficient shipyard availability. But in 1976, following the death of the main supporter of the project, Marshal Grechko, He was then succeeded by Marshal Dmitry Ustinov as the new Minister of Defense. Ustinov found the project being too expensive and so the plans were ordered to be redrawn and reduced to 60.000 tons to minimize the budget spending. Despite the attempts of redrawing and redesigning the plan to satisfy the demands of the Soviet Army, the plan was still too expensive and the entire project was cancelled in 1978. While the Orel never saw fruition, in the 1980s it influenced the also abortive Ulyanovsk program.

== See also ==
- Soviet aircraft carrier Ulyanovsk
- Russian aircraft carrier Kuznetsov
- List of ships of the Soviet Navy
- List of ships of Russia by project number
