= Safonovo-1 =

Military garrison in Murmansk Oblast, Russia

Coordinates: 69°01′22″N 33°17′43″E

Safonovo 1
- Murmansk Oblast, Russia

Site information
- Type: Garrison

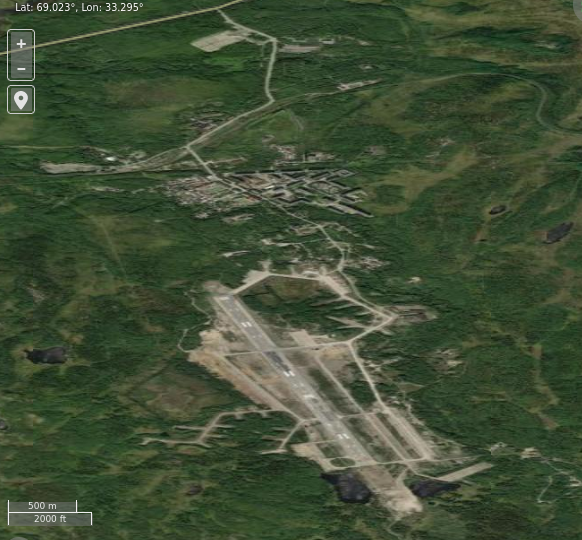
Satellite imagery of Safonovo-1 military garrison

Safonovo-1 (Russian: Сафоново-1) is a military garrison in Murmansk Oblast, Russia, located on the Kola Peninsula on the Kola Bay, 4 kilometers (2.5 mi) southwest of Severomorsk. Population: about 3000 (2009 est.). It was established around 1940.

== See also ==
- Severomorsk-2
