= Severomorsk-3 (air base) =

Russian Navy base in Murmansk Oblast

Severomorsk-3 Malyavr
- Severomorsk, Murmansk Oblast in Russia
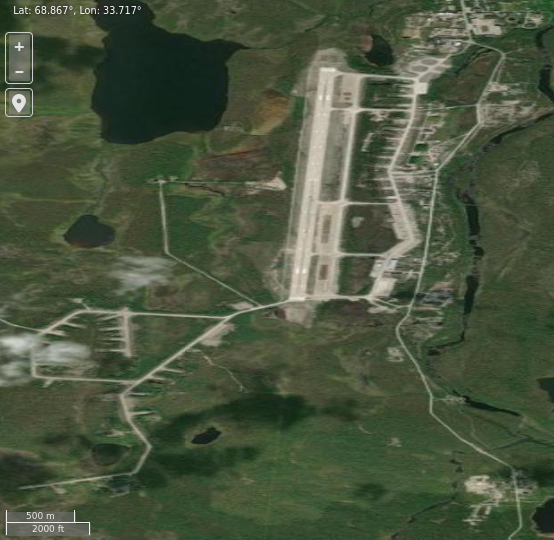
- Satellite imagery of Severomorsk-3 air base

Site information
- Type: Air Base
- Owner: Ministry of Defence
- Operator: Russian Navy - Russian Naval Aviation
- Controlled by: Northern Fleet

Location
- Shown within Murmansk Oblast Severomorsk-3 (Russia)
- Coordinates: 68°52′0″N 33°43′0″E

Site history
- Built: 1950
- In use: 1950 - present

Airfield information
- Identifiers: ICAO: ULMV
- Elevation: 172 metres (564 ft) AMSL
Runways
Direction	Length and surface
17/35	2,500 metres (8,202 ft) Concrete

Severomorsk-3 (ICAO: XLMV) (also referred to as Malyavr or Murmansk Northeast) is an air base of the Russian Navy's Northern Fleet Naval Aviation in Murmansk Oblast, Russia. It is located 28 kilometers (17 mi) east of Murmansk, next to Lake Malyavr in the west of the Kola Peninsula.

The base is home to the 100th Independent Shipborne Fighter Aviation Regiment with the Mikoyan MiG-29KR/KUBR (ASCC: Fulcrum-D) and the 279th Independent Shipborne Fighter Aviation Regiment with the Kamov Ka-52K "Katran", Sukhoi Su-25UTG (ASCC: Frogfoot), and Sukhoi Su-33 (ASCC: Flanker-D).

== History ==
The base was used by the:

- 987th Maritime Missile Aviation Regiment between 1952 and 1993 with the Tu-16.

In the late 1950s, Severomorsk-3 was an operating location for Tupolev Tu-16 Badger medium bombers and featured an 8200 ft (2500 m) concrete runway. In 1970 and 1971, Tu-16 jets in Egyptian Air Force markings were observed conducting training flights at Severomorsk-3. During the 1970s, the airfield was designated as a Yakovlev Yak-38 Forger base for the Murmansk area whenever its parent Kiev-class aircraft carrier was in port. Extensive Marston Mat planking was laid at the base in the late 1970s to support the Yak-38's VTOL requirements.

After the USSR's breakup, the main operator of Severomorsk-3 was the 279th Independent Naval Shturmovik Aviation Regiment (279 OMShAP) which joined the base during October 1976, operating at least 41 Sukhoi Su-25 aircraft in 1992, with 4 Su-25UB and 5 Su-25UTG trainers, plus 27 Yakovlev Yak-38 and 1 Yak-38U aircraft. The unit changed its name to the 279th Independent Shipborne Fighter Aviation Regiment (279 OKIAP) of Russian Naval Aviation sometime between 1992 and 2016 and it made up of two fighter and one training squadrons operating the Sukhoi Su-33, Sukhoi Su-27UB, and Su-25UTG.

The Russian Navy's ZEVS-ELF Transmitter is located directly south of Severomorsk-3.

In mid-2026, during the Russo-Ukraine War, it was reported that many of the 45th Air and Air Defence Forces Army's long-range air defence assets might have been redeployed out of the region in order to counter the Ukrainian drone threat in other regions of the country. This potentially left bases in the region more vulnerable should they be specifically targeted by Ukrainian long-range UAV forces. However, fortified and reinforced concrete hangar facilities, for fighters of Su-33 and MiG-29K size, were reported as under construction at the Severomorsk-3 air base.

== See also ==
- List of military airbases in Russia
- Severomorsk
- Severomorsk-1
- Severomorsk-2
