= 45th Air and Air Defence Forces Army =

Russian Aerospace Forces regiment

45th Air and Air Defense Army
- Great Emblem of the 45th Air and Air Defence Forces Army
- Active: December 1, 2015 – 2024
- Country: Russian Federation
- Branch: Russian Air Force
- Size: Army
- Part of: Northern Fleet OSK

Commanders
- Current commander: N/A

The 45th Air and Air Defense Army was an army of the Russian Aerospace Forces, part of the Northern Fleet Joint Strategic Command. From 2015 to 2024 it was the successor to the naval aviation of the Northern Fleet. The 45th Air Army was disbanded in 2024 and its assets divided between the newly formed 7th Composite Aviation Corps of the Northern Fleet and the Russian Air Force's 6th Guards Air and Air Defence Forces Army.

== History ==
The 45th Army of the Air Force and Air Defense of the Northern Fleet (military unit 06351) was formed in December 2015 on the basis of an order of the President of the Russian Federation in order to strengthen the air situation control system in the Arctic zone.

The carrier aviation of the 45th Army of the Air Force and Air Defense took part in the Russian military operation in Syria. From November to December 2016, from the aircraft carrier Admiral Kuznetsov, the pilots performed 420 sorties, 750 sorties to perform search and rescue tasks and aviation support. More than 1000 target facilities were destroyed. In 2017, after forces loyal to the Assad government won the Battle of Aleppo, the Admiral Kuznetsov and it's aviation wing left Syria.

The headquarters is located in Severomorsk. The army is part of the joint strategic command "Northern Fleet".

In 2018, the Northern Fleet resumed air patrols in the Arctic. In February 2019, it became known that the Russian Ministry of Defense plans to significantly increase the combat power of the Northern Fleet and deploy two squadrons of MiG-31 fighter-interceptors in the Murmansk region. In 2019, the 3rd Air Defense Division was formed to support the defense of the Arctic.

The army has taken part in the 2022 Russian invasion of Ukraine. In 2026, Aleksandr Otroshchenko, died in an accident when the Antonov An-26 he was in crashed in Crimea. He was reported to either to have been a former commander of the 45th Air Army or, alternatively, may have been the commander of the 7th Aviation Corps of the Northern Fleet.

The 45th Air Army was disbanded in 2024 and its assets divided between the 7th Aviation Corps of the Northern Fleet and the 6th Guards Air and Air Defence Forces Army of the Russian Air Force.

== Subordinate units ==
While active the command reportedly consisted of:

- Headquarters, military unit 06351 (township Safonovo, Severomorsk, Murmansk region);
- 1st Air Defense Division, military unit 03123 (Severomorsk);
  - 583rd Anti-Aircraft Missile Regiment, military unit 36226
  - 1528th Anti-Aircraft Missile Regiment, military unit 92485
  - 531st Guards Anti-Aircraft Missile Regiment, military unit 70148
  - 331st Radio Technical Regiment, military unit 36138
  - 332nd Radio Technical Regiment, military unit 21514
- 3rd Air Defense Division (arch. Novaya Zemlya, Tiksi, Dikson );
  - 33rd Anti-Aircraft Missile Regiment, military unit 23662
  - 414th Guards Anti-Aircraft Missile Regiment
- 98th Separate Guards Mixed Aviation Vislensky Red Banner, military unit 75385 (Monchegorsk airfield ): Su-24M, Su-24MR
- 174th Guards Fighter Aviation Pechenga Red Banner Regiment, (Monchegorsk airfield ) (MiG-31BM), commissioned in 2019.
- 403rd Separate Mixed Aviation Regiment, military unit 49324 (Severomorsk, Severomorsk-1 airfield, Murmansk region): Il-38, Il-20RT, Il-22M, An-12, An-26, Tu-134
- 100th Separate Shipborne Fighter Aviation Regiment, military unit 61287 (Severomorsk, Severomrosk-3 airfield, Murmansk region): MiG-29K, MiG-29KUB.
- 279th Separate Shipborne Fighter Aviation Smolensk Red Banner Regiment, military unit 98613 (Severomorsk, Severomorsk-3 airfield, Murmansk region): Su-33, Su-30SM, Su- 25UTG
- 830th Separate Shipborne Anti-submarine Helicopter Regiment, military unit 87268 (Severomorsk, Severomorsk-1 airfield, Murmansk region): Ka-27, Ka-29, Ka-31
- 2nd Guards Aviation Group, military unit 49324-2 (Kipelovo airfield);
- 3rd Guards Aviation Group, military unit 49324-3 (Ostafyevo airfield);
- 73rd long-range anti-submarine Aviation Squadron, military unit 39163 (Fedotovo, Kipelovo airfield, Vologda region): Tu-142MR, Tu-142MK
- N-th UAV regiment (Severomorsk, Severomorsk-1 airfield, Murmansk region)
- 89th separate aviation link (Arkhangelsk, Talagi Airport): 2 units. An-26, 2 units. Mi-8MTV-5
- Aviation commandant's office (Arkhangelsk region, Mirny, Plesetsk airfield)
- Aviation commandant's office (Arkhangelsk region, Novaya Zemlya archipelago, Rogachevo village, Amderma-2 airfield).
- Aviation commandant's office (Franz Josef Land archipelago, Alexandra Land island, Nagurskoe airfield).
- Aviation commandant's office (Severnaya Zemlya archipelago, Sredniy island, Sredniy airfield).
- Aviation commandant's office (the archipelago of the Novosibirsk Islands, Kotelny Island, Temp airfield).

== Commanders ==
- Lieutenant General Aleksandr Otroshchenko (2015-2024)

== See Also ==
- List of military airbases in Russia
