= Novofyodorovka, Altai Krai =

Novofyodorovka Новофёдоровка
- Settlement
- Location within Altai Krai Location within Russia
- Coordinates: 53°39′N 79°07′E
- Country: Russia
- Region: Altai Krai
- District: Khabarsky District
- Time zone: UTC+7:00

Novofyodorovka (Russian: Новофёдоровка) is a rural locality (a settlement) in Novoilyinsky Selsoviet, Khabarsky District, Altai Krai, Russia. The population was 2 as of 2013. It was founded in 1911. There is 1 street.

== Geography ==
Novofyodorovka is located 55 km northwest of Khabary (the district's administrative centre) by road.
