= Safonovo, Murmansk Oblast =

Safonovo Сафоново
- Urban-type settlement
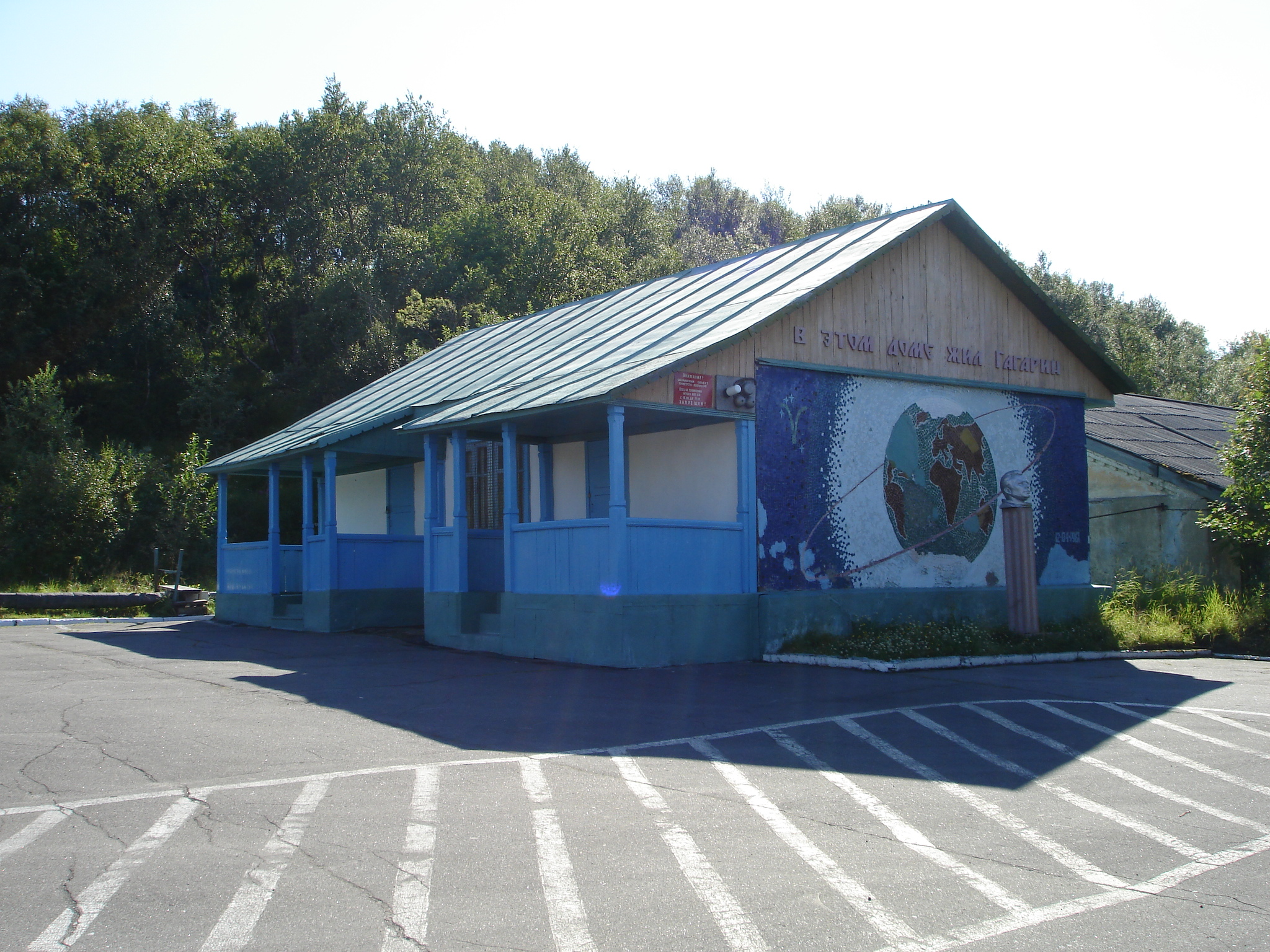
- Interactive map of Safonovo
- Location of Safonovo Safonovo (Murmansk Oblast)
- Coordinates: 69°04′N 33°18′E
- Country: Russia
- Federal subject: Murmansk Oblast
- Founded: ca. 1936
- Elevation: 41 m (135 ft)

Population (2010 Census)
  - Total: 5,255
  - Estimate (2025): 4,273 (−18.7%)

Administrative status
  - Subordinated to: closed administrative-territorial formation of Severomorsk

Municipal status
  - Urban okrug: Severomorsk Urban Okrug
- Time zone: UTC+3 (MSK)
- Postal codes: 184620, 184621
- Dialing code: +7 81537
- OKTMO ID: 47730000061

Safonovo (Russian: Сафоново) is an urban locality (an urban-type settlement) under the administrative jurisdiction of the closed-administrative territorial formation of Severomorsk in Murmansk Oblast, Russia, located on the Kola Peninsula on the Kola Bay, 3 kilometers (1.9 mi) west of Severomorsk proper. Population: 5,255 (2010 census); 4,853 (2002 census); 7,661 (1989 Soviet census).

== History ==
It was founded as a work settlement around 1936.
