= Novofedorovka =

Novofedorovka Новофёдоровка
- Village
- Location within Bashkortostan Location within Russia
- Coordinates: 54°06′N 56°04′E
- Country: Russia
- Region: Bashkortostan
- District: Aurgazinsky District
- Time zone: UTC+5:00

Novofedorovka (Russian: Новофёдоровка) is a rural locality (a village) in Ibrayevsky Selsoviet, Aurgazinsky District, Bashkortostan, Russia. The population was 799 as of 2010. There are 11 streets.

== Geography ==
Novofedorovka is located 24 km northeast of Tolbazy (the district's administrative centre) by road. Dubrovka is the nearest rural locality.
