= Severomorsk =

Severomorsk Североморск
- Town
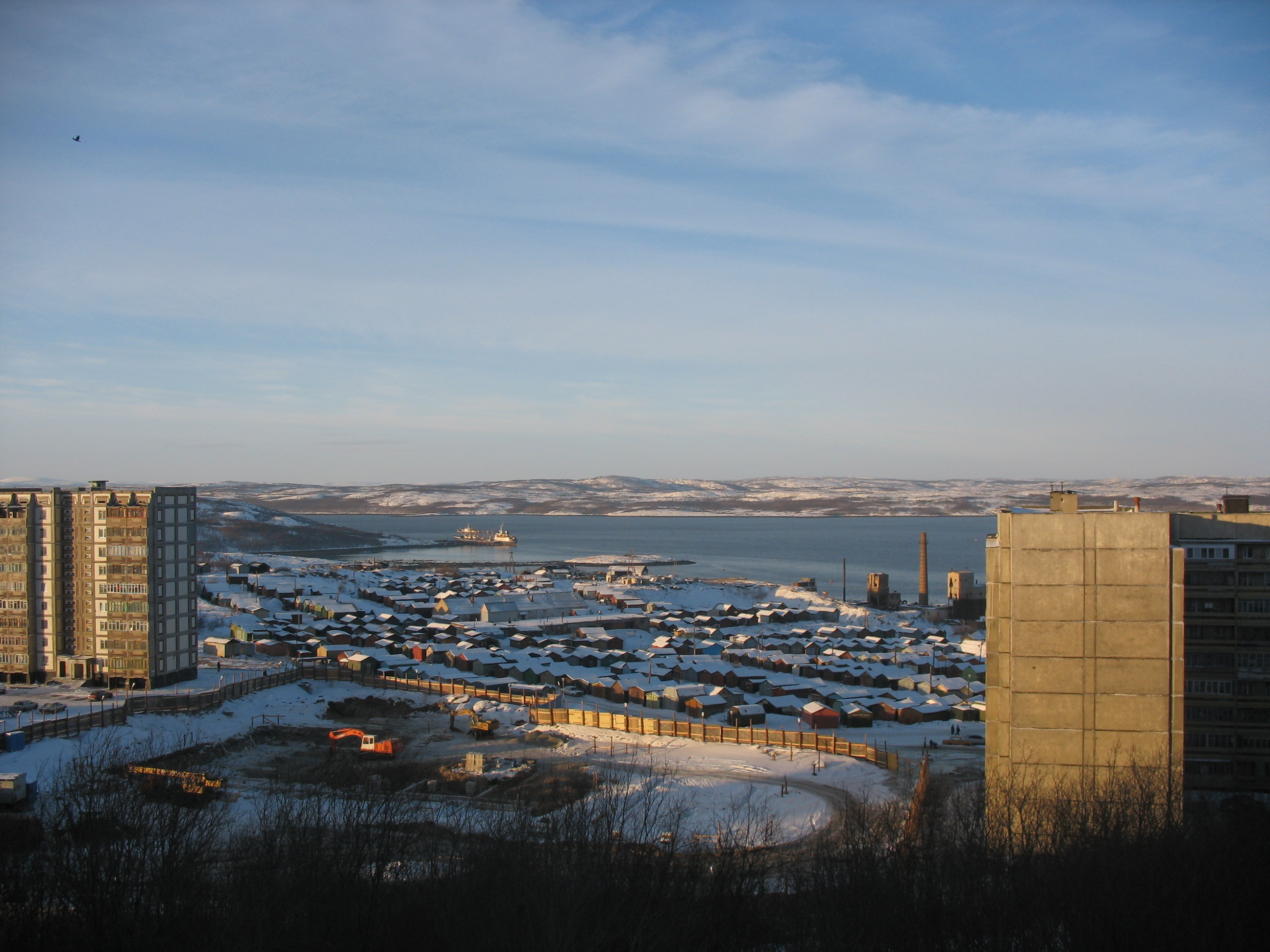
- View of the Kola Bay in Severomorsk

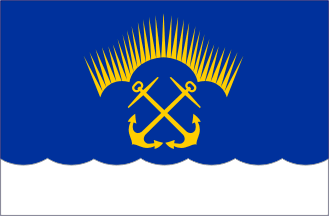
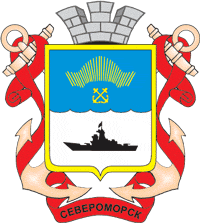
- Flag Coat of arms
- Interactive map of Severomorsk
- Location of Severomorsk Severomorsk (Murmansk Oblast)
- Coordinates: 69°04′N 33°25′E
- Country: Russia
- Federal subject: Murmansk Oblast
- Founded: 1896-1897
- Town status since: 18 April 1951

Government
  - Mayor: Alexander Abramov
- Elevation: 31 m (102 ft)

Population (2010 Census)
  - Total: 50,060
  - Estimate (2023): 43,394 (−13.3%)
  - Rank: 319th in 2010

Administrative status
  - Subordinated to: closed administrative-territorial formation of Severomorsk
  - Capital of: closed administrative-territorial formation of Severomorsk

Municipal status
  - Urban okrug: Severomorsk Urban Okrug
  - Capital of: Severomorsk Urban Okrug
- Time zone: UTC+3 (MSK)
- Postal code: 184606
- Dialing code: +7 81537
- OKTMO ID: 47730000001
- Website: www.citysever.ru

Severomorsk (Russian: Североморск, lit. 'northern sea [city]'), known as Vayenga (Ваенга) until 18 April 1951, is a closed town in Murmansk Oblast, Russia. Severomorsk is the main administrative base of the Russian Northern Fleet. The town is situated on the coast of the Barents Sea along the Kola Bay 25 kilometers (16 mi) northeast of Murmansk, the administrative centre of the oblast, to which it is connected by railway and a motorway. It is the main naval base of the Northern Fleet of Russia and the sixth largest city in the world beyond the Arctic Circle.

== History ==
=== Early settlement ===
The first settlement on the site of the current city was established between 1896 and 1897. It was named Vayenga (Ваенга), after the river, the name of which itself comes from the Sami "vayongg", meaning a female reindeer. The settlers were engaged in hunting, fishing and cattle breeding. In 1917, only thirteen people lived in the settlement.

=== The founding of the Northern Fleet Base ===
In 1926, a timber procurement office was founded in Murmansk, one of the teams of which was sent to Vayenga. A barrack-dormitory, a bathhouse, and a telephone line were built in Vayenga. In 1933, the bay was chosen as one of the bases for the newly created Northern Fleet. From 1934 and until the beginning of World War II, wooden and brick buildings and military facilities were built in the town, and the Vayenga-1 naval airfield was built in the neighbouring bay. From August 1941, all construction was mothballed. The airfield was used by the British; namely No. 151 Wing RAF to protect the Arctic Convoys before their fighters were later handed over to the Soviet Naval Aviation.

After the war, construction was resumed. Vayenga, given the existing facilities, was chosen as the main base for the Northern Fleet. On 1 September 1947, the headquarters and command of the Northern Fleet were relocated from Polyarny to Vayenga. In the same year, the first secondary school in the city was opened. The population of Vayenga was 3,884 people. In 1948, Vayenga's village Council of Workers' Deputies was formed.

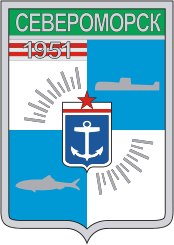
Coat of arms (1966)

=== Severomorsk ===
On 18 April 1951, Vayenga received town status and was renamed to Severomorsk, from the Russian "sever" (север), meaning "north", and "more" (море), meaning "sea". By the 1960s, the town was more developed: the city had a bakery, a sausage factory, a soft drink bottling plant and a swimming pool. On 26 November 1996, by the decree of the President of the Russian Federation, the town of Severomorsk, as a major naval base, was transformed into a closed administrative-territorial entity (ZATO) (urban district) with the inclusion of the following populated areas under its jurisdiction: Safonovo, Roslyakovo, Safonovo-1, Severomorsk-3 and Shchukozero.

== Geography ==
=== Location ===
Severomorsk is located on the Kola Peninsula in the Arctic Circle, in the permafrost zone, on the rocky east coast of the Kola Bay of the Barents Sea.

=== Climate ===
Severomorsk has a subarctic climate (Dfc), with long, very cold winters and cool to mild summers. The average temperature in January is -8 °C and 12 °C in July. The average precipitation is around 800 mm per year.

== Demographics ==
=== Population ===
Historical population
Year	Pop.	±%
1959	28,116	—
1970	40,919	+45.5%
1979	50,090	+22.4%
1989	62,120	+24.0%
2002	55,102	−11.3%
2010	50,060	−9.2%
2021	43,327	−13.4%
Population size may be affected by changes in administrative divisions. Source: Censuses

On 1 January 2015, out of 1114 Russian cities and towns, Severomorsk was ranked the 329th most populous.

According to the results of the Russian Census of 2010, the population of Severomorsk was 50,060. 26,503 (52.9%) of those were male, and 23,557 (47.1%) were female.

As of 2016, the population of Severomorsk has reached 50,905.

== Cityscape ==
=== Landmarks ===
- The Monument to the Heroes of Severomorsk, Defenders of the Arctic. More commonly known as "Alyosha", it is considered to be a symbol of the city. It is a figure of a sailor with a machine gun in his hands, 17 meters high, on a pedestal in the form of a submarine cabin, 10 meters high. It was created by the sculptors Georgy and Yury Nerod, and the architects V. Dushkin and A. Shashkov. Installed on Primorskaya Square on 10 June 1973.
- The Monument to the Heroes of the artillery 221-A of the Red Banner Northern Fleet battery. One of the most famous monuments in the city, it is a 130mm ship weapon on a concrete pedestal. It was created by the architects A. Shashkov, T. Shashkova, A. Weisman, and E. Panteleymonov. Installed on North Hill on Maritime Square on 6 November 1961.
- The Monument to the aviators of Severomorsk, "Aircraft IL-4". The plane was found in the hills by a search party, was brought back to the city, and was then restored over the course of a year. It was created by the architects G. Yevdokimova and S. Bachurin, and the engineer A. Strashny. Installed on Courage Square on 26 July 1981.
- The Memorial to the citizens of Severomorsk who did not return from the war. A monument in the form of an MT-LB armoured vehicle, it is dedicated to the soldiers killed in action in Afghanistan and the North Caucasus region. Installed on Courage Square on 19 July 2013, next to the "Aircraft IL-4".
- The Monument to the "Torpedo boat TKA-12". In the Great Patriotic War, this boat was commanded by the twice Hero of the Soviet Union Alexander Shabalin. It was created by the architects V. Alekseev and V. Gopak, and the engineer A. Strashny. Installed on Courage Square on July 31, 1983.
- Bust of the twice Hero of the Soviet Union Boris Safonov. Created by the sculptor E. Kitaychuk and the architect A. Shashkov. Installed on Safonov Square in 1967.
- Bust of the Hero of the Russian Federation Timur Apakidze. Created by the local artists S. Abarina and P. Abarin, and the main engineer of the project, A. Rechits. Installed on Safonovo Square in July 2003.
- The Museum of Severomorsk's and the Navy's History. Opened by the Severomorsk administration in October 1996 on Safonov street.
- Museum "Submarine K-21". A branch of the Naval Museum of the Northern Fleet. Opened in July 1983 on Courage Square.

== Politics ==
=== Local government ===
The representative bodies of the local self-government are the City Council of Deputies. The mayor of Severomorsk is Alexander Abramov.

Since 1991, the executive branch has been headed by Vitaly Voloshin. In the spring of 2011, he was approved to the post of the Head of Administration of Severomorsk. Since 16 April 2013, the position is occupied by Irina Norina.

=== Administrative and municipal status ===
Within the framework of administrative divisions, it is, together with the urban-type settlement of Safonovo and two rural localities, incorporated as the closed administrative-territorial formation of Severomorsk—an administrative unit with the status equal to that of the districts. As a municipal division, the closed administrative-territorial formation of Severomorsk is incorporated as Severomorsk Urban Okrug.

== Economy ==
=== Industry ===
Most of Severomorsk's industry is related to food, particularly the Severmorsk Dairy Plant and the Toni Bottling Plant. There is also a bread/bakery factory and a meat plant. The town also has construction and ship repair enterprises, and a well-developed infrastructure of housing and communal services, consumer services, and trade.

=== Education ===
Although the town has no higher education colleges, it hosts nine high schools.

== Military ==
Map of the Northern Fleet bases

The town is the main administrative base of the Russian Northern Fleet. Severomorsk has the largest dry dock on the Kola Peninsula.

On May 13, 1984, on the outskirts of Severomorsk, there was a major fire at a stockpile of naval missiles that resulted in numerous large explosions on May 17. The incident killed 200–300 people and destroyed at least one-third of the Northern Fleet's stockpile of surface-to-air missiles.

== Famous people ==
- Alexander Moiseenko, Ukrainian chess Grandmaster, born in Severomorsk in 1980.
- Boris Safonov, Soviet Naval Aviation fighter ace of World War II, served at Vaenga from 1940 until his death in 1942.
- Elena Vaenga (real name, Elena Vladimirovna Khrulyova), singer, songwriter and actress, born in Severomorsk in 1977.
- Lesya Yaroslavskaya, pop singer, born in Severomorsk in 1981.
- Maksim Fisenko, emo-pop singer, born in Severomorsk in 1998.

== Sister and partner cities ==
- Kemi, Finland
- Sør-Varanger, Norway
- Tervola, Finland
