= R-27 (air-to-air missile) =

Soviet air-to-air missile

R-27 AA-10 Alamo
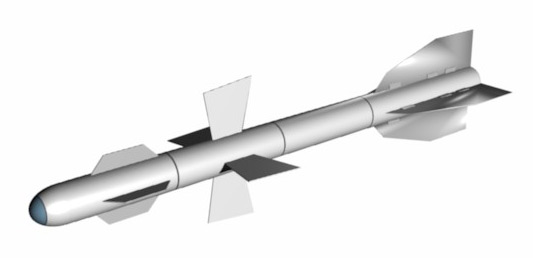
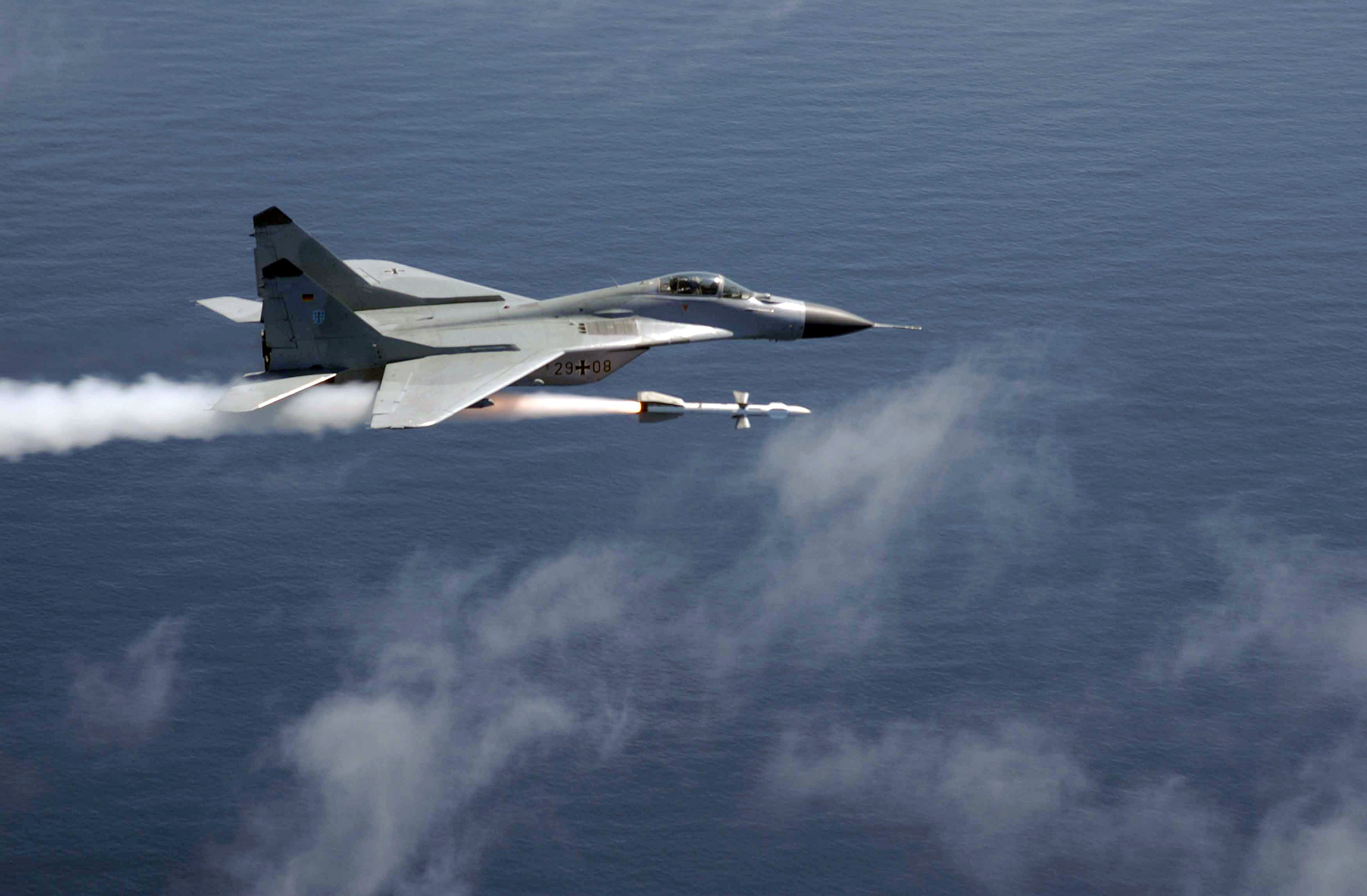
- R-27T German Air Force MiG-29 firing an R-27R
- Type: Medium range BVR air-to-air missile Anti-radiation missile (R-27P/EP)
- Place of origin: Soviet Union

Service history
- In service: 1983–present
- Wars: Iran–Iraq War; Eritrean–Ethiopian War; Russo-Ukrainian War; War in Donbas (alleged); Russo-Ukrainian war (2022–present); Yemeni Civil War (2014–present); Saudi Arabian-led intervention in Yemen

Production history
- Manufacturer: Vympel (Russia); Artem (Ukraine)
- Unit cost: N/A

Specifications
- Mass: 253 kg (558 lb)
- Length: 4.08 m (13.4 ft)
- Diameter: 230 mm (9.1 in)
- Wingspan: 772 mm (30.4 in)
- Warhead: Blast/fragmentation or continuous rod
- Warhead weight: 39 kg (86 lb)
- Detonation mechanism: Radar-proximity and impact fuzes
- Engine: High performance, w. directed-rocket motor Solid-fuel rocket motor
- Operational range: R-27T: up to 40 km (25 mi); R-27T1: up to 80 km (50 mi); R-27ET: up to 120 km (75 mi); R-27ET1: up to 80 km (50 mi); R-27R: up to 73 km (45 mi); R-27R1: up to 75 km (47 mi); R-27ER: up to 130 km (81 mi); R-27ER1: up to 100 km (62 mi); R-27P: up to 80 km (50 mi); R-27EP: up to 130 km (81 mi); R-27EA: up to 130 km (81 mi); R-27EM: up to 130 km (81 mi)
- Flight altitude: 20 m to 27 km (65 ft to 88,582 ft)
- Maximum speed: Mach 4.5-5.8 (version dependent) (3,452-4,450 mph, 5,555-7,161 kmh, 2,999-3,866 kn)
- Guidance system: Semi-active radar homing (R-27R/ER/EM); Active-radar homing (R-27A/EA); Infrared homing (R-27T/ET); Passive-radiation homing (R-27P/EP)
- Launch platform: Su-27, Su-30, Su-33, Su-34, Su-35, Su-39, Su-37, F-14 (done by Iran), MiG-23, MiG-29, Yak-141, J-11 (done by China), local conversion as a surface-to-air missile in Yemen

The Vympel R-27 (Russian: Вымпел Р-27; NATO reporting name AA-10 Alamo) is a family of air-to-air missiles developed by the Soviet Union during the late Cold War-era.

The R-27 is manufactured in infrared-homing/IR (R-27T, R-27ET) and semi-active radar homing/ SARH (R-27R, R-27ER) versions. The R-27 family missiles are produced by both Russian and Ukrainian manufacturers. The R-27 missile is carried by the Mikoyan MiG-29 and the Sukhoi Su-27, Su-30 and Su-35 family fighters. The R-27 missile is also license-produced in China, though the production license was bought from Ukraine instead of Russia. Plans to produce an active radar homing/ ARH version called the R-27EA were cancelled in 1989.

== Variants ==
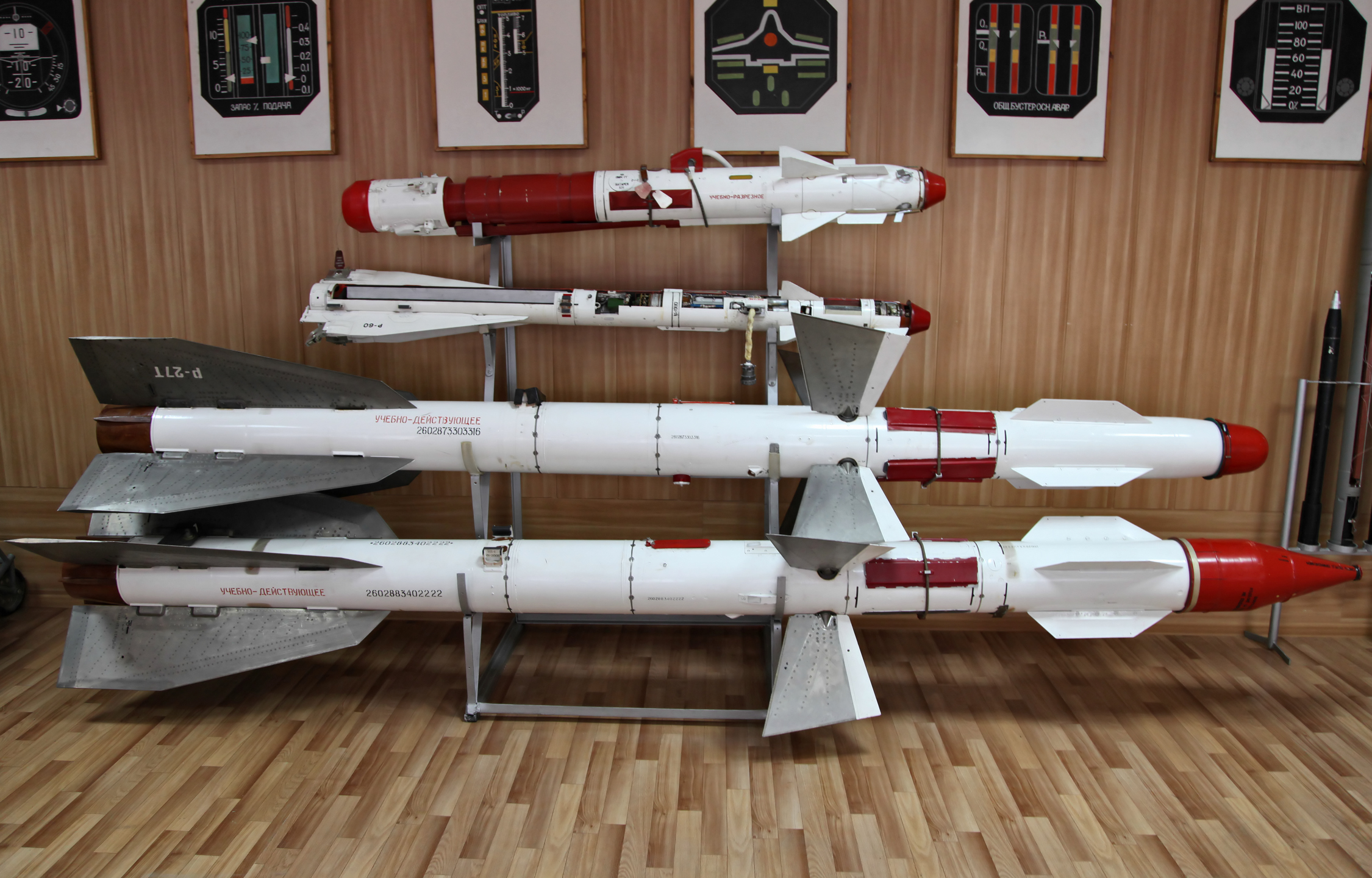
R-27T (Second from bottom) and R-27R (First from bottom)

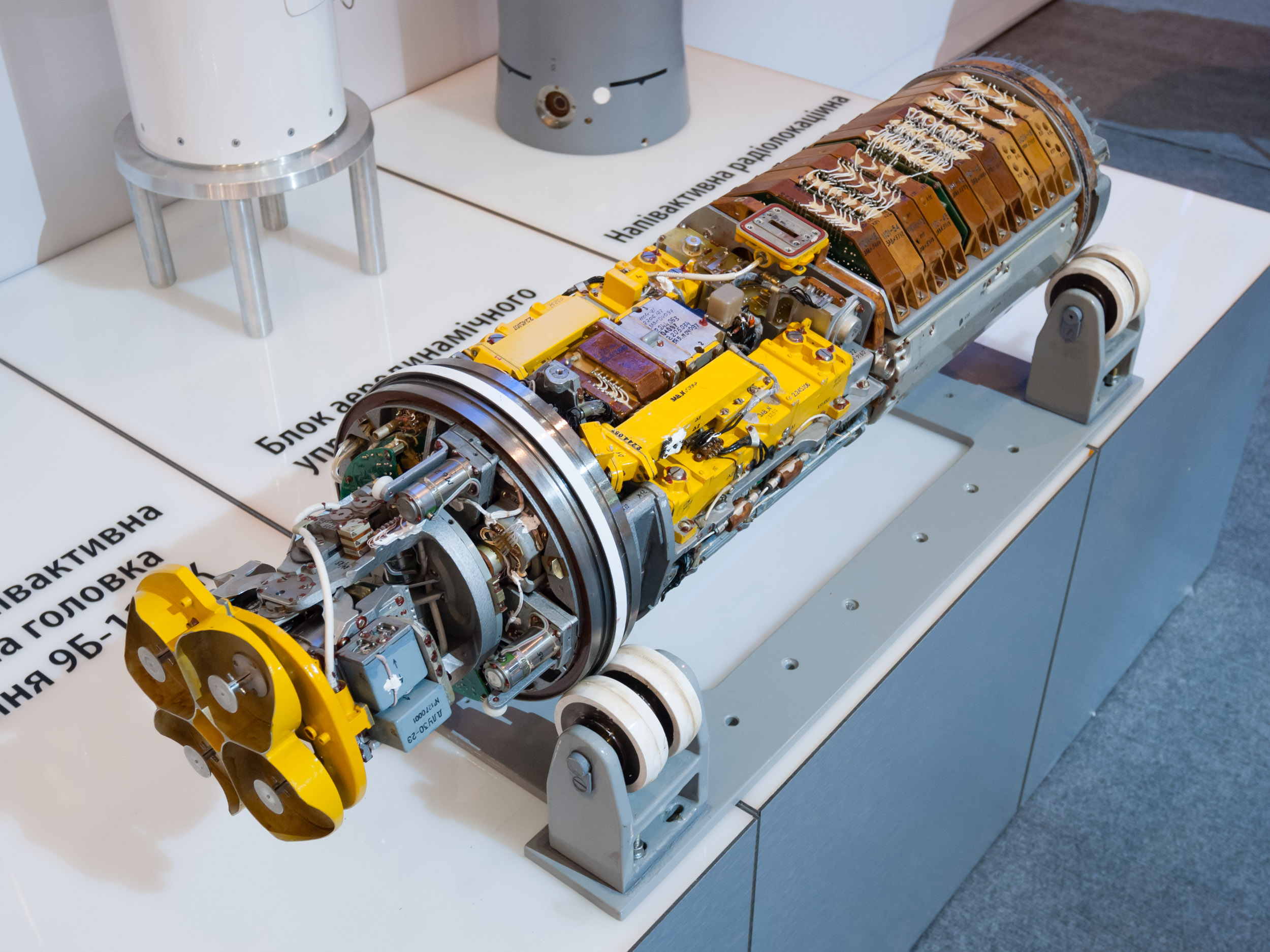
9B-1101K, inertial semi-active homing head for R-27R missiles.

- R-27R: AA-10 Alamo-A, semi-active radar homing. Missile can be used at 20–25,000 m (66–82,021 ft) altitude (launch platform or target). Effective kill range for a target at same altitude: 2–42.5 km (1.2–26.4 mi) head-on, 0.7–7.5 km (0.43–4.66 mi) tail-on. Maximum range: 73 km (45 mi). Maximum allowed vertical separation between target and launch platform: +/− 10 km (6.2 mi).
- R-27R1: Export model of the R-27R. The missile has a maximum range of 75 kilometres (47 mi) with 39 kg (86 lb) warhead.
- R-27T: AA-10 Alamo-B, infrared homing, passive homing using the Avtomatika 9B-1032 (PRGS-27) IR seeker head. Missile can be used at 20–25,000 m (66–82,021 ft) altitude. Effective kill range for a target at same altitude: 2–33 km (1.2–20.5 mi) head-on, 0–5.5 km (0.0–3.4 mi) tail-on. Maximum range: 63 km (39 mi). Maximum allowed vertical separation: +/− 10 km (6.2 mi).
- R-27T1: Export model of the R-27T. The missile has a maximum range of 80 kilometres (50 mi) with 39 kg (86 lb) warhead.
- R-27ER: AA-10 Alamo-C, the semi-active-radar homing extended-range version. Missile can be used at 20–27,000 m (66–88,583 ft) altitude. Effective kill range for a target at same altitude: 2–65.5 km (1.2–40.7 mi) head-on, 0.7–16.5 km (0.43–10.25 mi) tail-on. Missile cannot be fired at altitude less than 3 km (1.9 mi) against a target with background earth, if launch range is less than 6 km (3.7 mi). Maximum range: 117 km (73 mi). Maximum allowed vertical separation: 12 km (7.5 mi).
- R-27ER1: Export model of the R-27ER. The missile has a maximum range of 100 kilometres (62 mi) with 39 kg (86 lb) warhead.
- R-27ET: AA-10 Alamo-D, the infrared-homing extended-range version, Weight 348 kg (767 lb). Missile can be used at 20–27,000 m (66–88,583 ft) altitude. Effective kill range: 2–52.5 km (1.2–32.6 mi) head-on, 0.7–12.5 km (0.43–7.77 mi) tail-on. Maximum range: 104 km (65 mi). Maximum allowed vertical separation: 12 km (7.5 mi).
- R-27ET1: Export model of the R-27ET. The missile has a maximum range of 80 kilometres (50 mi) with 39 kg (86 lb) warhead.

R-27R and ER variants can be used in any meteorological conditions. Launch can be made at less than 5 g overload and less than 50 deg/s roll rate. It is allowed to redesignate targets during flight, and can share target illumination with other aircraft.

R-27T and ET variants can be used out of cloudiness, at least 15 degrees away from the bearing of sun, and 4 degrees away from the bearing of moon and ground-based heat-contrasting conditions. In cases of maximum head-on range launches where lock-command cannot be utilized, the missile can't be fired. The seeker must acquire target before launch. On the combat operations section of the Su-27 manual, this is especially recommended for head-on usage for passive attacks at targets with 0 degrees approach angle (i.e. another fighter moving to intercept), leaving target unalerted to the incoming missile. Launch can be made at 0 to 7 g, but limited to 6 g if roll induced slip is more than 2× diameter of the ball.

Other variants:

- R-27P AA-10 Alamo-E, passive radiation homing with a range of up to 72 km (45 mi).. This variant was developed in tandem with the R and T versions, intended to destroy any radar emitting air targets by homing in on their emissions, for example fighters and AWACS. The first test launches were conducted in 1984 from a MiG-29, and the missile considered ready for service in 1987. However it wouldn't be used until much later as the radar warning receivers in use at the time were not precise enough and didn't provide enough target information for reliable targeting. With the introduction of the L-150 "Pastel" RWR, that would be fixed, and it was first offered for export in early 2004.
- R-27EP AA-10 Alamo-F, a longer range passive anti-radiation missile with a range of up to 110 km (68 mi). It uses the same seeker as the R-27P, but with the stronger motor found on the R-27ER.
- R-27A(K-27A), a proposed active radar homing version of the R-27R with the 9B-1103 seeker. Several examples were made, and 12 test flights were made on a MiG-29 testbed. 2 guided launches were carried out as well. However, funding was diverted in 1989 and the project cancelled. The correct name of the missile is K-27A as it never left the prototyping stage.
- R-27EA(K-27EA), active radar homing with 9B-1103 active seeker, range of >130 km (81 mi). This was a proposed longer ranged version of the aforementioned K-27A with the R-27ER motor, cancelled at the same time as the 27A in 1989. None were made.
- R-27EM(K-27EM), semi-active radar homing with RGS-31 semi-active seeker, range of 130 km (81 mi). This was intended to be a combined guidance version with an inertial control system and linear radio correction, which would have mitigated multipath interference and allowed it to hit extremely low targets. No missiles were produced, but several RGS-31 seeker heads were built and bench tested before funding was cut in July 1991.

== Operational service ==
=== Ethiopia and Eritrea ===
In the 1999 Eritrean-Ethiopian War, Eritrean MiG-29s fought Ethiopian Su-27s, both piloted by Russian mercenaries. Only one R-27 fired by an Ethiopian Su-27 at an Eritrean MiG-29 proximity-fuzed near enough to the MiG that the damaged aircraft eventually crashed on landing.

=== Russia and Ukraine ===
During the war in Donbas, the Ukrainian Air Force claimed that one of its Su-25 was shot down by a Russian Aerospace Forces MiG-29 using a R-27T on 16 July 2014. Russian officials denied any involvement.

The R-27 was used by both sides during the 2022 Russian invasion of Ukraine.

=== Yemen ===
During the Yemeni Civil War (2015–present) Houthis have used R-27T missiles modified to serve as surface-to-air missiles. A video released on January 7, 2018, also shows a modified R-27T hitting a Saudi led coalition fighter on a forward looking infrared camera. Houthi sources claim to have downed an F-15. Rebels later released footage showing an aircraft wreck. However, serial numbers on the wreckage suggested that the downed aircraft was a Panavia Tornado, also operated by Saudi forces. On January 8, the Saudi Press Agency admitted the loss of an aircraft over Yemen, though it did not clarify whether it was a Tornado or an F-15, blaming the crash on 'a technical issue' and reporting that the pilots ejected and were recovered by friendly forces.

On 21 March 2018, Houthi rebels released a video where they hit and possibly shot down a Saudi F-15 in Saada province. In the video, an R-27T air-to-air missile adapted for surface to air use appeared to have successfully hit a jet. As in the video of the previous similar hit recorded on 8 January, the target, while clearly hit, did not appear to be downed. The Saudi forces confirmed the hit, while saying the jet safely landed at a Saudi base. Saudi official sources confirmed the incident reporting that it happened at 3:48 pm local time after a surface-to-air missile was launched at the fighter jet from inside Saada airport.

== Operators ==
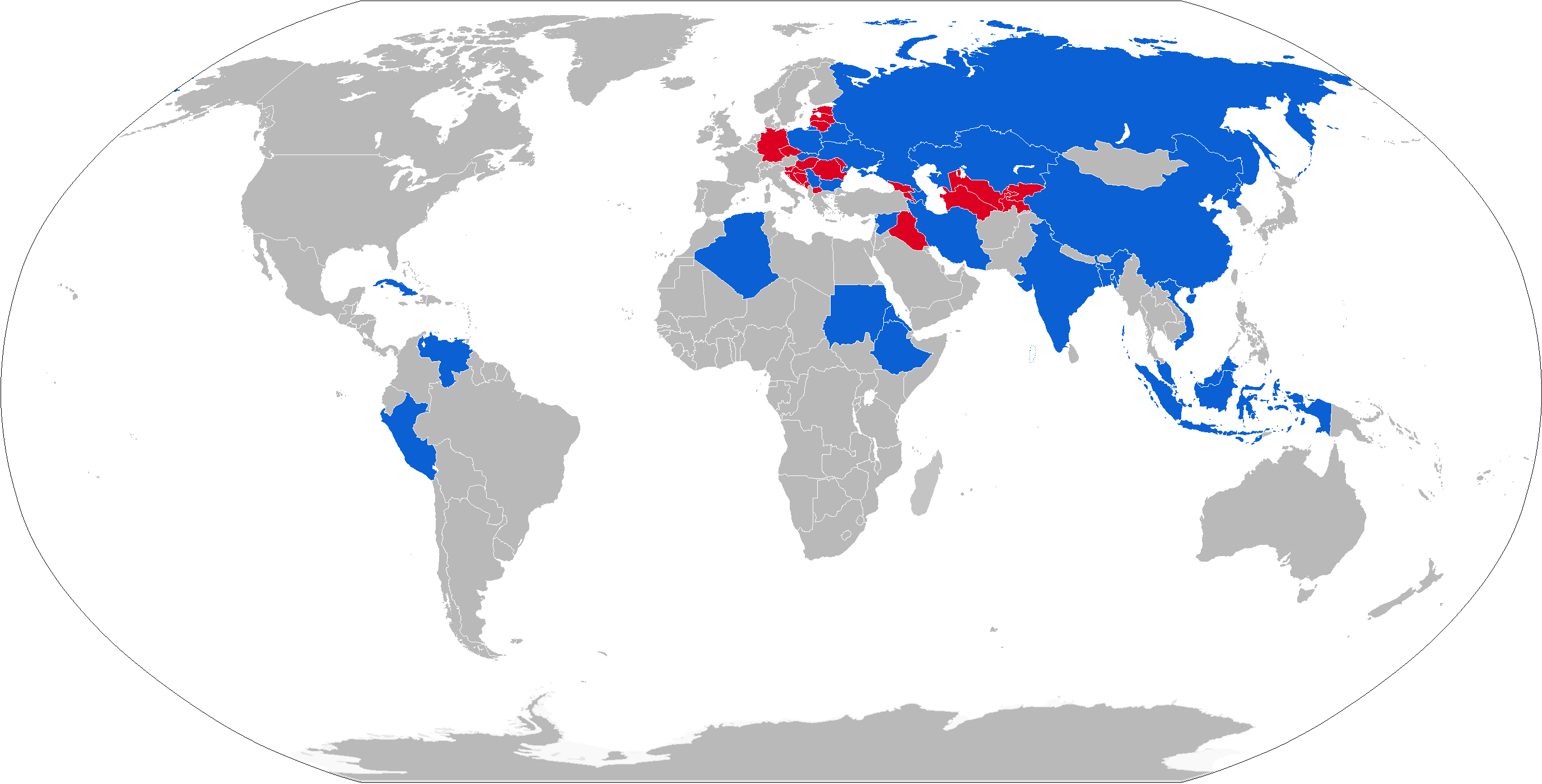
Operators Current Former

=== Current ===
- Algeria
- Angola
- Armenia − R-27R
- Azerbaijan − R-27T and R-27R
- Bangladesh − R-27R
- Belarus − R-27R and R-27ER
- Bulgaria − R-27R
- China − R-27T and R-27R Used by the PLAAF and PLANAF
- Eritrea
- Ethiopia
- India − Used by the Air Force and Navy
- Indonesia
- Iran − R-27T and R-27R
- Kazakhstan − R-27T, R-27ER, and R-27R
- (Libya) Libyan National Army − R-27T
- Malaysia
- Myanmar
- North Korea − R-27R/ER
- Peru
- Poland − R-27R
- Russia − R-27T/ET, R-27R/ER, and R-27P/EP used by the Air Force; R-27T/ET used by the Navy
- Serbia − R-27ER
- Sudan
- Syria
- Uganda
- Ukraine − R-27ET, R-27ET1, R-27ER and R-27ER1
- Uzbekistan
- Venezuela − R-27T/ET and R-27R/ER

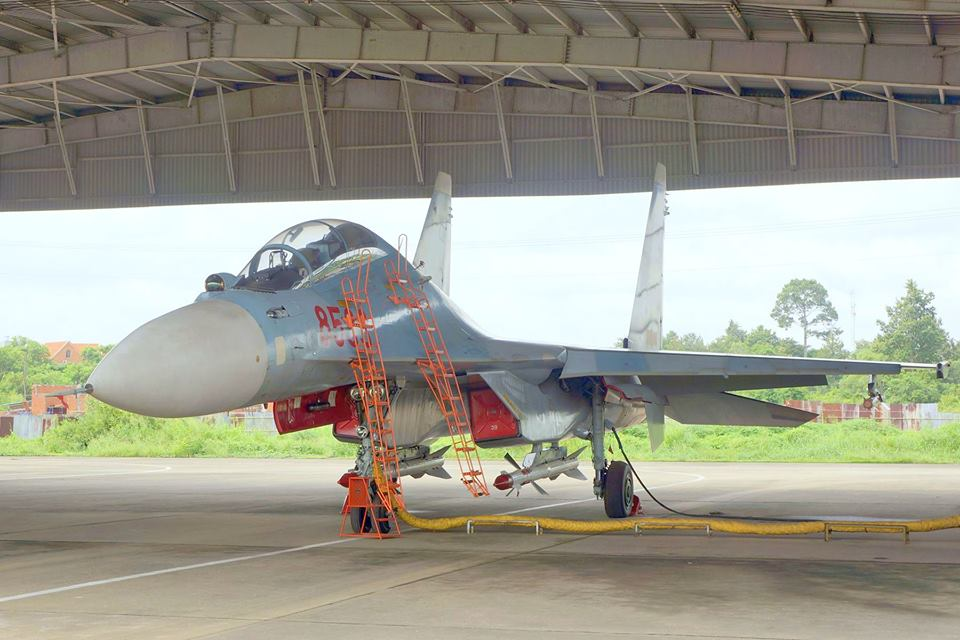
A pair of R-27ERs installed on a Vietnamese Su-30MK2

- Vietnam

=== Former ===
- Cuba − Used on MiG-29s, aircraft no longer operational
- Czechoslovakia
- Czech Republic
- East Germany − Passed on to Germany after the German reunification
- Germany
- Hungary
- Iraq
- Romania
- Soviet Union − Passed on to successor states
- Slovakia
- Yemen
- Yugoslavia − Passed on to successor states

== See also ==
- List of missiles
- R-77 – (Russia)
- R-37 (missile) – (Russia)

Similar weapons

- AIM-7 Sparrow – (United States)
- Aspide – (Italy)
- Super 530 – (France)
- PL-11 – (China)
