= Association of Old Crows =

Electronic warfare professional organization

- Company type: Non-profit
- Industry: Electronic Warfare, Information Operations, Cyberwarfare
- Founded: 1964
- Headquarters: Alexandria, Virginia, United States
- Area served: Worldwide
- Website: www.crows.org

The Association of Old Crows is an international nonprofit professional organization specializing in electronic warfare, tactical information operations, and associated disciplines headquartered in Alexandria, Virginia. Its mission is to "advocate the need for a strong defense capability emphasizing electronic warfare and information operations to government, industry, academia, and the public."

== History ==
The name "Old Crows" emerged from the first use of electronic warfare in World War II to disrupt Axis communications and radars. Allied equipment and operators were known by the code name "Raven". Common jargon changed the name to "Crows" and those engaged in the profession became known as "Old Crows".

== Activities ==
The organization draws expertise and information from its members consisting of a pool of thousands of individuals, including technology specialists and actual military personnel. It is involved in advancing electronic warfare and information-gathering techniques, disseminating information on these topics, and supporting the education of personnel in related scientific matters.

=== Journal of Electromagnetic Dominance (JED) ===
First established in 1977 as the Journal of Electronic Defense, the organization publishes the JED as a monthly magazine of military science covering developments in the fields of electronic warfare, signals intelligence, electronic intelligence and communications intelligence. The magazine serves as the official media outlet of the Association, and is headquartered in Gainesville, Florida.

In May 2020, the magazine was renamed from the Journal of Electronic Defense to the Journal of Electromagnetic Dominance to reflect its broader mission of, "thinking in terms of an EM Domain and a wide-ranging, enterprise-based strategy for EMS Operations (EMSO)."
