= Sukhoi Su-37 =

Experimental thrust-vectoring version of the Su-35 fighter aircraft

Su-37
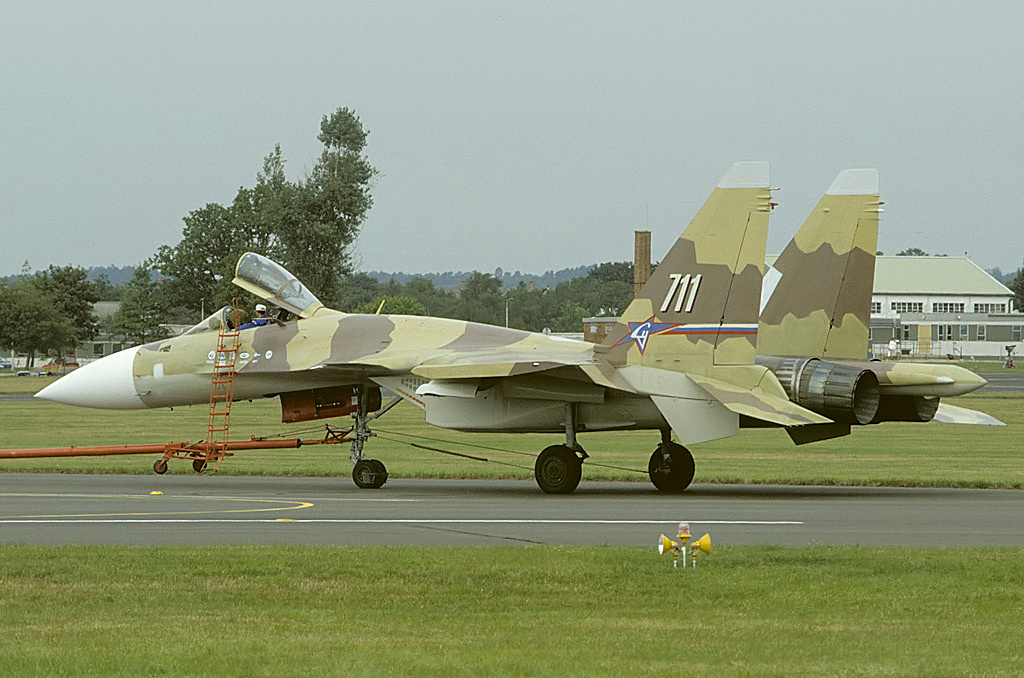

General information
- Type: Air superiority fighter Technology demonstrator
- National origin: Russia
- Designer: Sukhoi Design Bureau
- Built by: Komsomolsk-on-Amur Aircraft Production Association
- Status: Out of service and production, prototype, crashed in 2002
- Number built: 1

History
- Introduction date: 25 October 1997
- First flight: 2 April 1996; 30 years ago
- Developed into: Sukhoi Su-30MKI (India); Sukhoi Su-30MKM (Malaysia); Sukhoi Su-30SM (Russia); Sukhoi Su-35 (Russia and China)

The Sukhoi Su-37 (Russian: Сухой Су-37; NATO reporting name: Flanker-F; popularly nicknamed "Terminator") was a single-seat twin-engine aircraft designed by the Sukhoi Design Bureau which served as a technology demonstrator. It met the need to enhance pilot control of the Su-27M (later renamed Su-35), a further development of the Su-27. The sole example built was originally the eleventh Su-27M (T10M-11) built by the Komsomolsk-on-Amur Aircraft Production Association before having thrust-vectoring nozzles installed. It also had updated flight- and weapons-control systems. The aircraft made its maiden flight in April 1996. Throughout the flight-test program, the Su-37 demonstrated its supermaneuverability at air shows, performing manoeuvres such as a 360-degree somersault. The aircraft crashed in December 2002 due to structural failure. The Su-37 did not enter production, despite a report in 1998 which claimed that Sukhoi had built a second Su-37 using the twelfth Su-27M airframe, T10M-11 remained the sole prototype. Sukhoi had instead applied the aircraft's systems to the design bureau's other fighter designs.

== Design and development ==
Head on view

The Sukhoi Design Bureau started research on thrust vectoring in 1983, when the Soviet government tasked the bureau with the separate development of the Su-27M. At the insistence of General Director Mikhail Simonov, who had been the chief designer of the Su-27, Sukhoi and the Siberian Aeronautical Research Institute studied axisymmetrical vectoring nozzles. This was in contrast to the focus on two-dimensional nozzles prevailing in the West. Lyulka (later Lyulka-Saturn) also began studies of thrust-vectoring engines in 1985. By the late 1980s, Sukhoi were evaluating their research using its flying test beds.

During test flights of the Su-27Ms, which began in 1988, engineers discovered that pilots failed to maintain active control of the aircraft at high angles of attack due to the ineffectiveness of flight control surfaces at low speeds. Engineers therefore installed thrust-vectoring engines to the eleventh Su-27 (factory code T10M-11), which had been built by the Komsomolsk-on-Amur Aircraft Production Association in the country's Far East and was being used as a radar test bed. Following the airframe's completion in early 1995, the aircraft was delivered to the design bureau's experimental plant near Moscow, where engineers started installing the nozzles on the aircraft. (Note: According to Flight International, engineers started installing the nozzles to the aircraft in late 1994.) Although Sukhoi had intended the Lyulka-Saturn AL-37FU to power the aircraft, the engine had not yet been flight-cleared. The aircraft was temporarily fitted with the less-powerful AL-31FP engine, essentially an AL-31F engine that had the AL-100 vectoring nozzles of the AL-37FU. The aircraft was rolled out in May. Two months later, the temporary engines were replaced with AL-37FUs; its nozzles could only deflect 15 degrees up or down in the pitch axis, together or differentially.

Apart from the addition of thrust-vectoring nozzles, the Su-37 did not outwardly differ much from the canard-equipped Su-27M. Instead, engineers had focused on the aircraft's avionics. Unlike previous Su-27Ms, the Su-37 had a digital (as opposed to analogue) fly-by-wire flight control system, which was directly linked to the thrust-vectoring control system. Together with the aircraft's overall high thrust-to-weight ratio and the engine's full authority digital engine control feature, the integrated propulsion and flight control systems added maneuverability at high angles of attack and low speeds. The aircraft's weapons-control system had also been improved, as it included an N011M Bars (literally "Panther") pulse-Doppler phased-array radar that provided the aircraft with simultaneous air-to-air and air-to-ground capability. The radar was capable of tracking twenty aerial targets and directing missiles toward eight of them simultaneously; in comparison, the Su-27M's baseline N011 could only track fifteen aerial targets and engage six of them simultaneously. The aircraft retained from the Su-27M the N012 self-defence radar located in the rearward-projecting tail boom.

Considerable improvement had also been made to the cockpit layout. In addition to the head-up display, the Su-37 had four Sextant Avionique multi-function colour liquid crystal displays arranged in a "T" configuration; they had better backlight protection than the Su-27M's monochrome cathode-ray tube displays. The displays presented to the pilot information about navigation, systems status, and weapons selection. The pilot sat on an ejection seat that was reclined to 30 degrees to improve g-force tolerance.

Painted in a disruptive sand and brown scheme, the aircraft was given the code 711 Blue, later changed to 711 White. Following ground checks at the Gromov Flight Research Institute, the aircraft made its maiden flight on 2 April 1996 from Zhukovsky Airfield outside Moscow, piloted by Yevgeni Frolov. The nozzles were fixed during the first five flights. (Note: Quote: "The aircraft, Su-27 number 711, had five flights in April, apparently with the axisymmetric nozzles in a fixed configuration.") Due to the lack of funding from the Russian Air Force, Sukhoi was compelled to finance the project with its own funds; according to Simonov, the company channelled revenue from the exports of the Su-27s to China and Vietnam towards the project. The aircraft was publicly unveiled at Zhukovsky later in the year, and was redesignated Su-37.

== Operational history ==
During the subsequent flight-test programme, the Su-37's supermaneuverability as a result of thrust-vectoring controls became apparent. According to Simonov, such a feature would allow pilots to develop new combat manoeuvres and tactics, greatly enhancing its effectiveness in dogfights. Among the new manoeuvres was the Super Cobra, which was a variation of the Pugachev's Cobra and was demonstrated during the aircraft's international debut at the Farnborough Airshow in September 1996. Piloted by Frolov, the aircraft pitched up 180 degrees and maintained the tail-first position momentarily, which would theoretically allow the aircraft to fire a missile at a combat opponent. The Super Cobra evolved into the kulbit (somersault), in which the Su-37 performed a 360-degree loop with an extremely tight turning radius the length of the aircraft. According to test pilot Anatoly Kvochur, thrust vectoring would have given the aircraft a considerable advantage in close-in dogfights. Nonetheless, critics have questioned the practical benefits of such manoeuvres; although they would allow an early missile lock-on, it would come at the expense of a rapid loss of kinetic energy, which would leave the aircraft vulnerable when pilots missed their first shot.

The aircraft was demonstrated at the Paris Air Show in 1997. Although it was only able to perform on the last day of the show, the organisers recognised the Su-37 as the standout performer at the event. The aircraft thereafter participated in the MAKS air show in Moscow, the International Defence Exhibition in Dubai, and the FIDAE air show in Santiago, Chile, as authorities sought to export the aircraft. With the expiration of the engines' service lives, the aircraft had the AL-37FUs replaced with standard production AL-31F engines which lacked movable nozzles. The loss of thrust vectoring was partially mitigated by an update to the fly-by-wire flight control system. The aircraft's foreign avionics were also replaced with indigenous designs. It resumed test flights in October 2000.

The flight-test programme ended on 19 December 2002 when the aircraft's port tailplane broke off during a high-g manoeuvre, leading to it crashing at Shatura, near Moscow. The structural failure was caused by repeated exceeding of the aircraft's design load during six years of testing. The pilot Yuri Vashuk ejected safely. Despite the entry of the Su-37 into Brazilian and South Korean fighter tenders, the aircraft failed to gain any foreign customers. India in the mid-1990s funded the development of what would result in the Su-30, which is a two-seat fighter design that incorporated the canards, N011M radar and thrust-vectoring technology that were present and evaluated on the Su-37. In addition, through tests of the Su-27M and the Su-37, engineers had determined that thrust vectoring could compensate for the loss of manoeuvrability brought about by the removal of canards, the design of which imposed a weight penalty on the airframe. The modernized Su-35, without canards, made its first flight in February 2008.

== Specifications (Su-37) ==
Data from Gordon, Novichkov

General characteristics

- Crew: 1
- Length: 21.935 m (72 ft 0 in)
- Wingspan: 14.698 m (48 ft 3 in)
- Height: 6.36 m (20 ft 10 in)
- Wing area: 62 m^{2} (670 sq ft)
- Empty weight: 18,500 kg (40,786 lb)
- Max takeoff weight: 34,000 kg (74,957 lb)
- Powerplant: 2 × Saturn AL-37FU afterburning turbofan engines, 83 kN (19,000 lbf) thrust each with axisymmetrical thrust-vectoring nozzles dry, 142 kN (32,000 lbf) with afterburner

Performance

- Maximum speed: 2,500 km/h (1,553 mph, 1,350 kn) at high altitude
- Maximum speed: Mach 2.35
  - Mach 1.14, 1,400 km/h (870 mph; 760 kn) at sea level
- Range: 3,300 km (2,100 mi, 1,800 nmi) at high altitude
  - 1,390 km (860 mi; 750 nmi) at sea level
- Service ceiling: 18,800 m (61,700 ft)
- g limits: +9
- Rate of climb: 230 m/s (45,000 ft/min)

Armament

- Guns: 1× 30 mm GSh-30-1 internal cannon with 150 rounds
- Hardpoints: 12 hardpoints, consisting of 2 wingtip rails, and 10 wing and fuselage stations with a capacity of 8,000 kg (17,630 lb) of ordnance.

Avionics

- OLS-35 infra-red search and track system
- N-011M Bars passive electronically scanned array radar
- N012 self-defence radar
- Sextant Avionique (Thales) LCD multi-function displays

== See also ==
Related development

- Sukhoi Su-27
- Sukhoi Su-30
- Sukhoi Su-33
- Sukhoi Su-34
- Sukhoi Su-35
- Sukhoi Su-47

Aircraft of comparable role, configuration, and era

- General Dynamics F-16 VISTA
- McDonnell Douglas F-15 ACTIVE
- McDonnell Douglas F/A-18 HARV

Related lists

- List of military aircraft of the Soviet Union and the CIS
