= Sukhoi Su-27 =

Soviet 4th generation fighter aircraft

Su-27
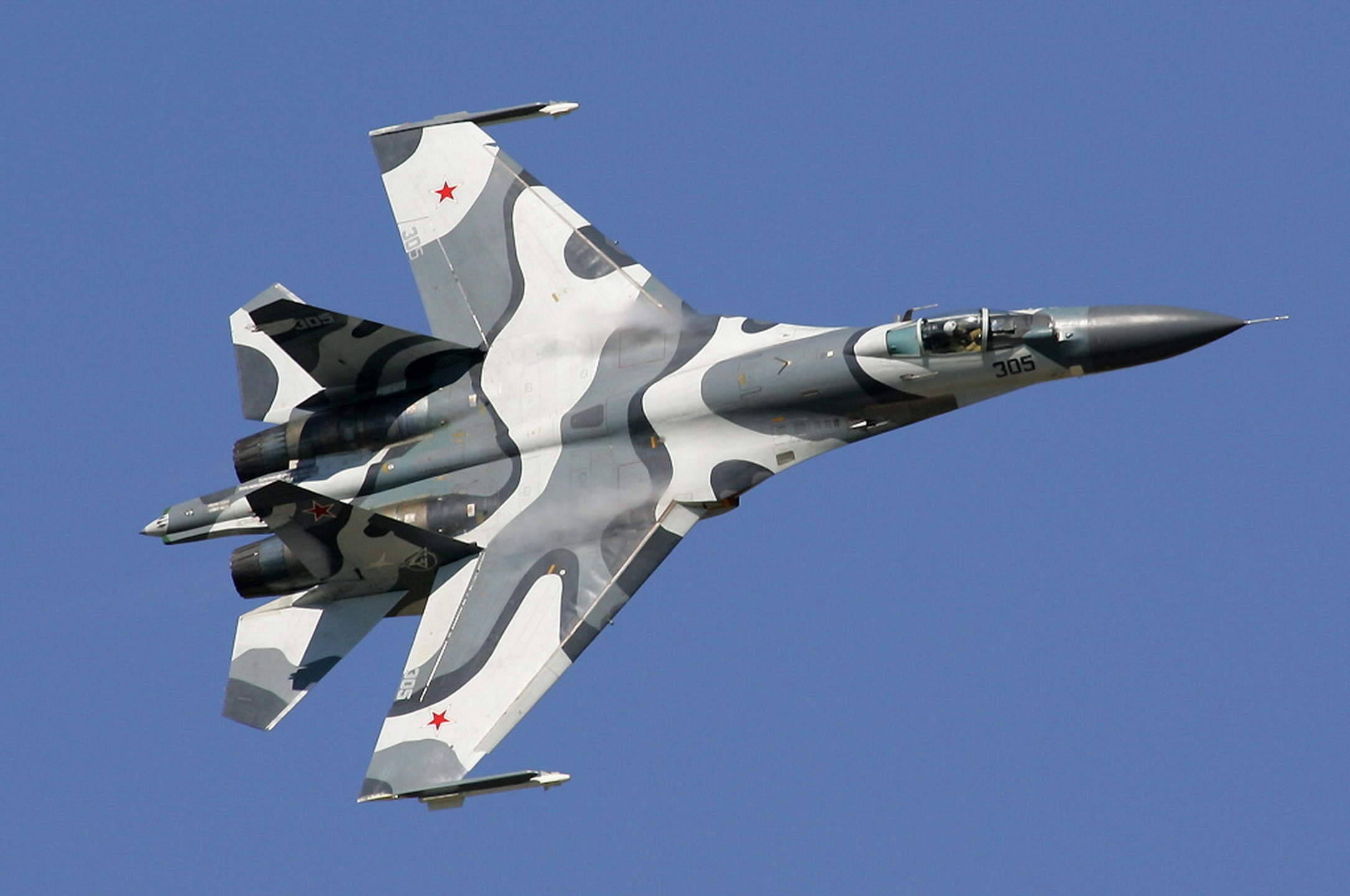
- Su-27SKM at MAKS-2005 airshow

General information
- Type: Multirole fighter, air superiority fighter
- National origin: Soviet Union / Russia
- Manufacturer: Sukhoi
- Status: In service
- Primary users: Russian Aerospace Forces People's Liberation Army Air Force; Uzbekistan Air and Air Defence Forces; See Operators section for others
- Number built: 680

History
- Manufactured: 1982–2010
- Introduction date: 22 June 1985
- First flight: 20 May 1977
- Variants: Sukhoi Su-30; Sukhoi Su-33; Sukhoi Su-34; Sukhoi Su-35; Sukhoi Su-37; Shenyang J-11

The Sukhoi Su-27 (Russian: Сухой Су-27; NATO reporting name: Flanker) is a Soviet twin-engine supersonic supermaneuverable fighter aircraft designed by Sukhoi. It was intended as a direct competitor for the large US fourth-generation jet fighters such as the Grumman F-14 Tomcat and McDonnell Douglas F-15 Eagle, with 3,530-kilometre (1,910 nmi) range, heavy aircraft ordnance, sophisticated avionics and high maneuverability. The Su-27 was designed for air superiority missions, and subsequent variants are able to perform almost all aerial warfare operations. It was designed with the Mikoyan MiG-29 as its complement.

The Su-27 entered service with the Soviet Air Forces in 1985. The primary role was long range air defence against American SAC Rockwell B-1B Lancer and Boeing B-52G and H Stratofortress bombers, protecting the Soviet coast from aircraft carriers and flying long range fighter escort for Soviet heavy bombers such as the Tupolev Tu-95, Tupolev Tu-22M and Tupolev Tu-160.

The Su-27 was developed into a family of aircraft; these include the Su-30, a two-seat, dual-role fighter for all-weather, air-to-air and air-to-surface deep interdiction missions; the Su-33, a naval fleet defence interceptor for use from aircraft carriers; the side-by-side two-seat Su-34 strike/fighter-bomber variant; and the Su-35 improved air superiority and multirole fighter. A prototype thrust-vectoring version was also created, called the Su-37. The Shenyang J-11 is a Chinese license-built version of the Su-27.

== Development ==
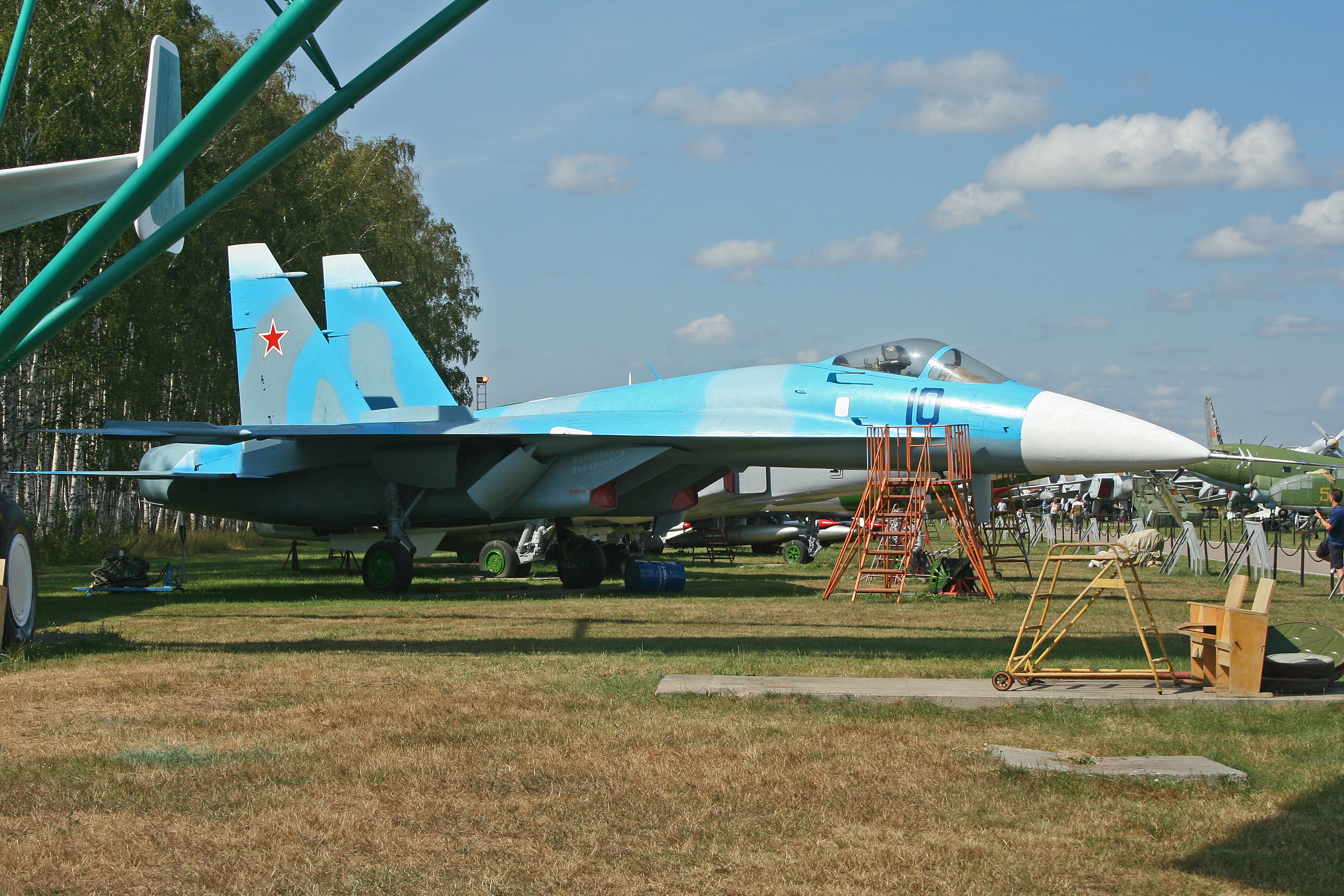
Prototype Sukhoi T-10

In 1969, the Soviet Union learned of the U.S. Air Force's "F-X" program, which resulted in the F-15 Eagle. The Soviet leadership soon realised that the new American fighter would represent a serious technological advantage over existing Soviet fighters. "What was needed was a better-balanced fighter with both good agility and sophisticated systems." In response, the Soviet General Staff issued a requirement for a Perspektivnyy Frontovoy Istrebitel (PFI, literally "Prospective Frontline Fighter", roughly "Advanced Frontline Fighter"). Specifications were extremely ambitious, calling for long-range, good short-field performance (including the ability to use austere runways), excellent agility, Mach 2+ speed, and heavy armament. The aerodynamic design for the new aircraft was largely carried out by TsAGI in collaboration with the Sukhoi design bureau.

When the specification proved too challenging and costly for a single aircraft in the number needed, the PFI specification was split into two: the LPFI (Lyogkyi PFI, Lightweight PFI) and the TPFI (Tyazholyi PFI, Heavy PFI). The LPFI program resulted in the Mikoyan MiG-29, a relatively short-range tactical fighter, while the TPFI program was assigned to Sukhoi OKB, which eventually produced the Su-27 and its various derivatives.

The Sukhoi design, which was altered progressively to reflect Soviet awareness of the F-15's specifications, emerged as the T-10 (Sukhoi's 10th design), which first flew on 20 May 1977. The aircraft had a large wing, clipped, with two separate podded engines and a twin tail. The 'tunnel' between the two engines, as on the F-14 Tomcat, acts both as an additional lifting surface and hides armament from radar.

The T-10 was influenced by the Sukhoi Aircraft Design Bureau (Su-ADB), Central Aero-Hydrodynamic Institute (TsAGI) and the Siberian Aviation Research Institute (SibNIA) in their development of a new aerodynamic scheme labelled the 'integral scheme', where the aircraft would have optimal performance under a longitudinal instability of 3-5% mean aerodynamic chord while flying in subsonic regimes as well as fly by wire (FBW) for future heavy fighters. Stability problems present in the development of airframes under similar performance demands such as the YF-22 and JAS-39 Gripen were rectified during the FBW development process through limitation of normal load factor and angle of attack. Controlled high angle of attack maneuverability, known as supermaneuverability, was emphasized after a 1980s study by research teams from Su-ADB and TsAGI showing its effectiveness in close combat.

=== Air Force ===
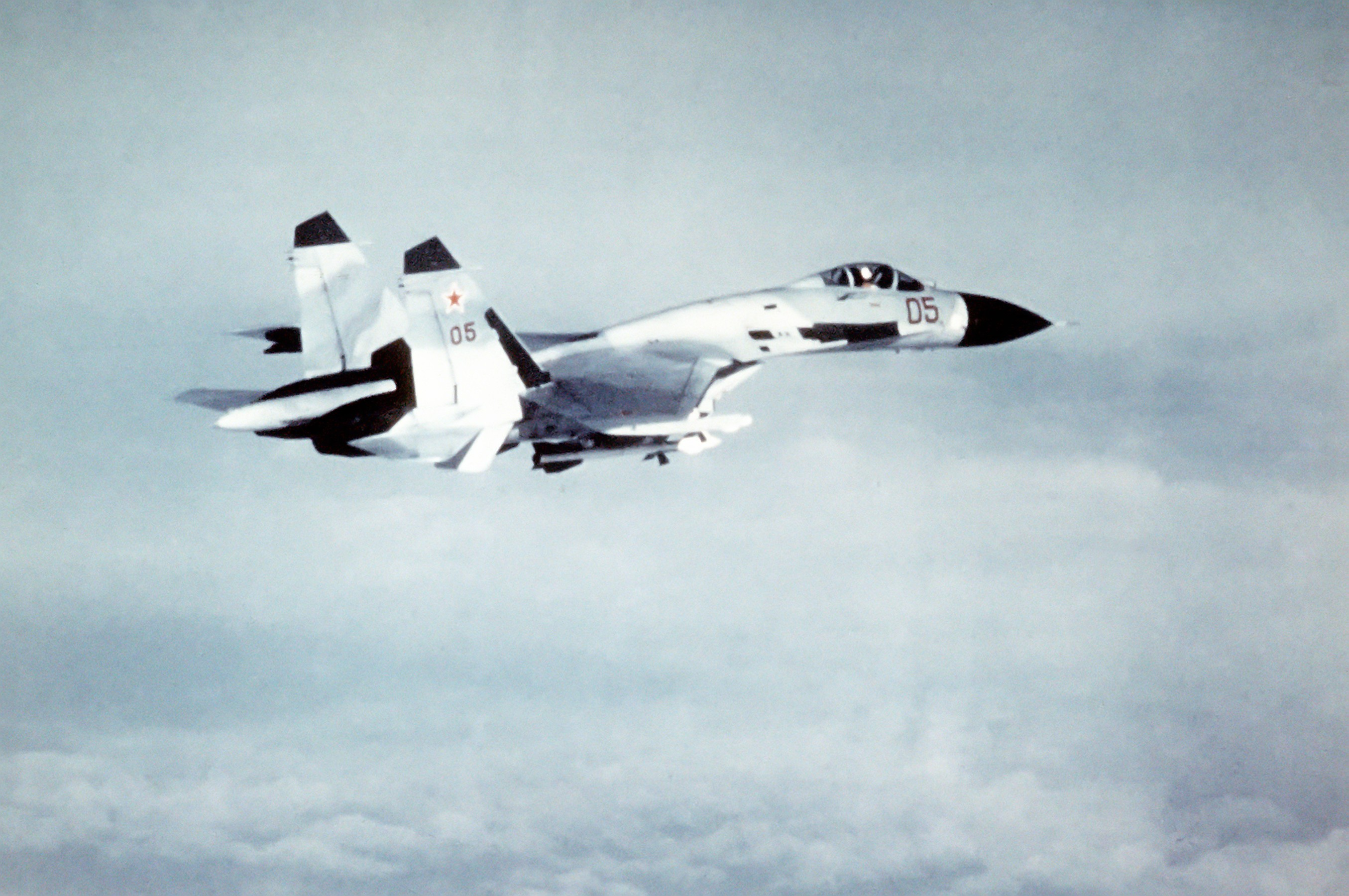
Soviet Su-27 in flight

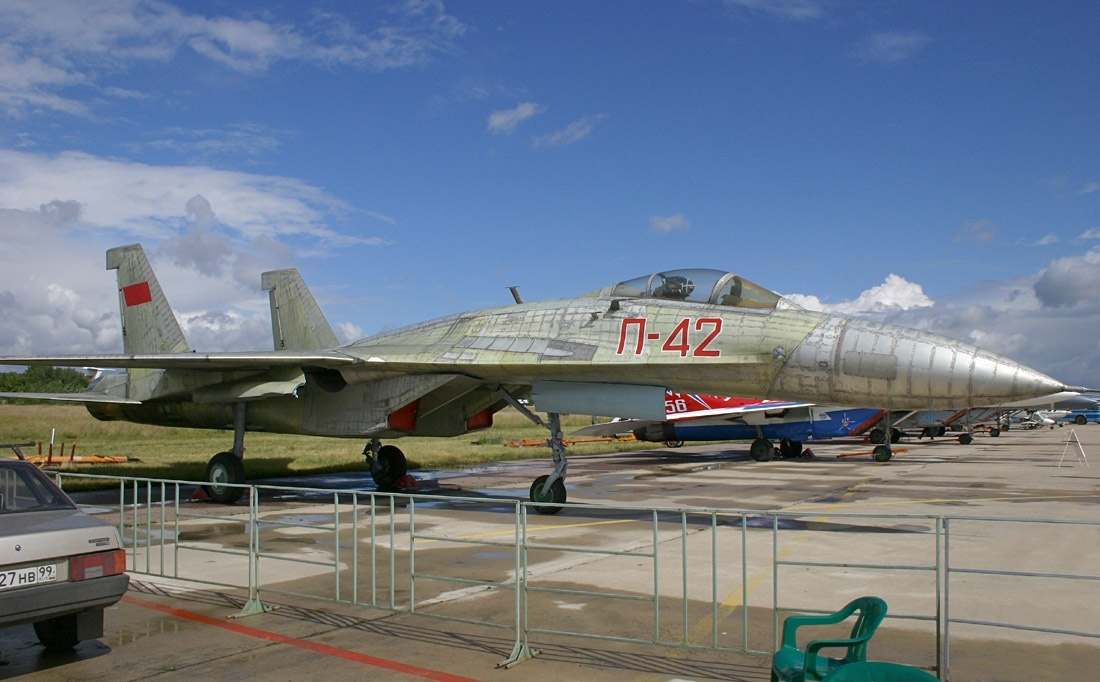
P-42 at Ramenskoye airfield

The first batch of flying prototypes were T-10-1 and T-10-2. They were powered by Lyulka AL-21 turbojets and had ogival wings. The aerodynamic layout was found to be unsatisfactory during construction; this was verified starting with T-10-1's maiden flight on 20 May 1977. The aircraft completed trials in November 1983 and donated to the Soviet Air Force Museum in late-1985. T-10-2 first flew on 16 May 1978. On 7 July 1978, it crashed and killed the pilot; the aircraft exceeded its G limit and broke-up in flight after behaving unpredictably when the control stick was pulled back. The prototypes were initially called "Ram-K" by Western intelligence; they were first spotted by Western satellite imagery at the Flight Research Institute's (LII) "Ramenskoye" airfield at Zhukovsky; they were later assigned the NATO reporting name "Flanker-A". Komsomolsk-on-Amur Aircraft Plant (KnAAPO) built second batch - T-10-3 and T-10-4 - starting in 1978. These were the first to be fitted with the intended powerplant, the Lyulka AL-31 turbofan, and their engine nacelles were redesigned accordingly. T-10-3 was initially used for powerplant testing; it first flew on 23 August 1979 after being delayed by engine trouble. In 1982 and 1983, it performed land-based STOBAR tests for naval aviation. T-10-4 was used for avionics and armament testing with the Mech radar. Tests with the T-10-4 and the later T-10-10 revealed serious deficiencies with the Mech radar. KnAAPO built a third batch of "type T-10-5" AL-21-powered aircraft - T-10-5, T-10-6, T-10-9, T-10-10, T-10-11 - for avionics tests. T-10-6 was destroyed in October 1980 in a ground fire caused by a leaking fuel line. T-10-10 and T-10-11 performed radar, weapons control and targeting tests. These prototypes found that avionics weight, AL-31 fuel consumption, and aerodynamics failed to meet requirements.

The aircraft underwent a major redesign. Sukhoi accepted greater cooperation from SibNIA, which conducted extensive wind tunnel testing. Contemporary Western aircraft were examined for ideas. The new design - T-10S - bore only a superficial resemblance to the T-10; the design was completed in 1980 and was the precursor to the production Su-27. The first batch of flying T-10S prototypes were T-10-7 (or T-10S-1) and T-10-12 (or T-10S-2). T-10-7 was used for handling, manoeuvring, and AL-31 tests; it had no radar or mission avionics. It first flew on 20 April 1981, and crashed on 3 September 1981 after a critical in-flight failure; the pilot ejected and survived, but the project's chief was replaced and the flight engineer was dismissed. T-10-12 was completed by KnAAPO in March 1981 for fire control testing. On 23 December 1981, it broke-up in flight and killed the pilot. Sukhoi's general designer was dismissed after the crash. KnAAPO produced additional batches in 1982 - T-10-15, T-10-17 to T-10-22 - and 1983 - T-10-23 to T-10-27. T-10-17 was the first aircraft built to full production standard and first flew on 26 May 1982. In 1983, it landed after losing part of a wing and a tail fin from structural failure. T-10-21 crashed on 25 May 1984 after a structural failure of a leading edge flap; the pilot ejected and survived.

The T-10S-3 was modified and officially designated the P-42, setting a number of world records for time-to-height, beating those set in 1975 by a similarly modified F-15 called "The Streak Eagle". The P-42 "Streak Flanker" was stripped of all armament, radar and operational equipment. The fin tips, tail-boom and the wingtip launch rails were also removed. The composite radome was replaced by a lighter metal version. The aircraft was stripped of paint, polished and all drag-producing gaps and joints were sealed. The engines were modified to deliver an increase in thrust of 1,000 kg (2,200 lb), resulting in a thrust-to-weight ratio of almost 2:1 (for comparison with standard example see Specifications).

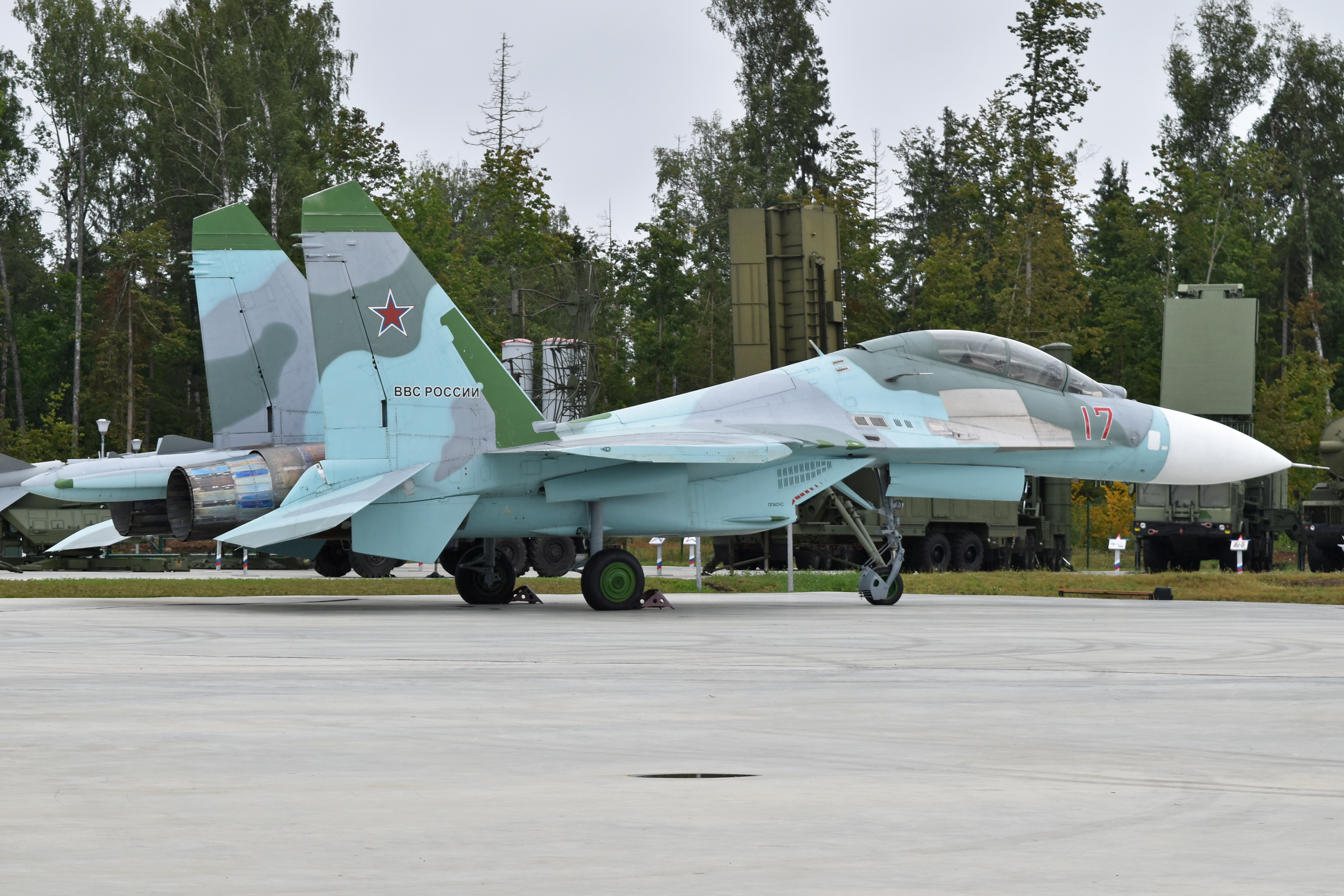
Twin-seat combat trainer Su-27UB of the Russian Aerospace Forces

The production Su-27 (sometimes Su-27S, NATO designation 'Flanker-B') began to enter VVS operational service in 1985, although manufacturing difficulties kept it from appearing in strength until 1990. The Su-27 served with both the V-PVO and Frontal Aviation. Operational conversion of units to the type occurred using the Su-27UB (Russian for Uchebno Boevoy - "combat trainer", NATO designation 'Flanker-C') twin-seat trainer, with the pilots seated in tandem.

When the naval Flanker trainer was being conceived the Soviet Air Force was evaluating a replacement for the Su-24 "Fencer" strike aircraft, and it became evident to Soviet planners at the time that a replacement for the Su-24 would need to be capable of surviving engagements with the new American F-15 and F-16. The Sukhoi bureau concentrated on adaptations of the standard Su-27UB tandem-seat trainer. However, the Soviet Air Force favoured the crew station (side-by-side seating) approach used in the Su-24 as it worked better for the high workload and potentially long endurance strike roles. Therefore, the conceptual naval side-by-side seated trainer was used as the basis for development of the Su-27IB (Russian for Istrebityel Bombardirovshchik - "fighter bomber") as an Su-24 replacement in 1983. The first production airframe was flown in early 1994 and renamed the Su-34 (NATO reporting name 'Fullback').

=== Navy ===
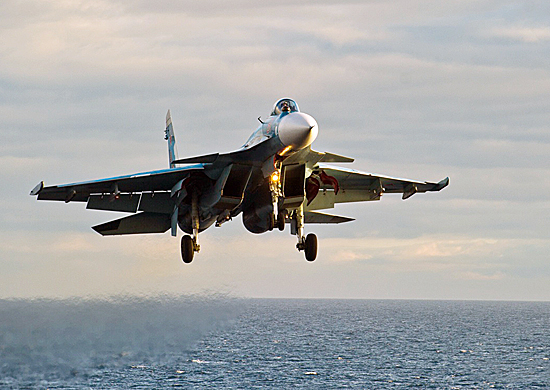
A Su-33 on approach

Development of a version for the Soviet Navy designated Su-27K (from Korabyelny - "shipborne", NATO designation 'Flanker-D') commenced not long after the development of the main land-based type. Some of the T-10 demonstrators were modified to test features of navalized variants for carrier operations. These modified demonstrators led to specific prototypes for the Soviet Navy, designated "T-10K". Some of the T-10Ks had canards, an arresting hook and carrier landing avionics as well as a retractable inflight refueling probe. They did not have the landing gear required for carrier landings or folding wings. The first T-10K flew in August 1987 flown by the famous Soviet test pilot Viktor Pugachev (who first demonstrated the Cobra maneuver using an Su-27 in 1989), performing test takeoffs from a land-based ski-jump carrier deck on the Black Sea coast at Saky in the Ukrainian SSR. The aircraft was lost in an accident in 1988.

At the time the naval Flanker was being developed the Soviets were building their first generation of aircraft carriers and had no experience with steam catapults and did not want to delay the introduction of the carriers. Thus it was decided to use a takeoff method that did not require catapults by building up full thrust against a blast deflector until the aircraft sheared restraints holding it down to the deck. The fighter would then accelerate up the deck onto a ski jump and become airborne.

The production Su-27K featured the required strengthened landing gear with a two-wheel nose gear assembly, folding stabilators and wings, outer ailerons that extended further with inner double slotted flaps and enlarged leading-edge slats for low-speed carrier approaches, modified leading edge root extension (LERX) with canards, a modified ejection seat angle, upgraded fly-by-wire, upgraded hydraulics, an arresting hook and retractable inflight refuelling probe with a pair of deployable floodlights in the nose to illuminate the tanker at night. The Su-27K began carrier trials in November 1989, again with Pugachev at the controls, on board the first Soviet aircraft carrier, called Tbilisi at the time and formal carrier operations commenced in September 1991.

Development of the naval trainer, called the Su-27KUB (from Korabyelny Uchebno-Boyevoy - "shipborne trainer-combat"), began in 1989. The aim was to produce an airframe with dual roles for the Navy and Air Force suitable for a range of other missions such as reconnaissance, aerial refuelling, maritime strike, and jamming. This concept then evolved into the Su-27IB (Su-34 "Fullback") for the Soviet Air Force. The naval trainer had a revised forward fuselage to accommodate a side-by-side cockpit seating arrangement with crew access via a ladder in the nose-wheel undercarriage and enlarged canards, stabilisers, fins and rudders. The wings had extra ordnance hardpoints and the fold position was also moved further outboard. The inlets were fixed and did not feature foreign object damage suppression hardware. The central fuselage was strengthened to accommodate 45 tonnes (99,000 pounds) maximum gross weight and internal volume was increased by 30%. This first prototype, the T-10V-1, flew in April 1990 conducting aerial refuelling trials and simulated carrier landing approaches on the Tbilisi. The second prototype, the T-10V-2 was built in 1993 and had enlarged internal fuel tanks, enlarged spine, lengthened tail and tandem dual wheel main undercarriage.

=== Export and post-Soviet development ===
In 1991, the production facilities at KnAAPO and Irkutsk developed export variants of the Su-27: the Su-27SK single seat fighter and Su-27UBK twin-seat trainer, (the K in both variants is Russian for "Kommercheskiy" - literally "Commercial") which have been exported to China, Vietnam, Ethiopia and Indonesia. After the collapse of the USSR in 1991, Russia, the successor state, started development of advanced variants of the Su-27 including the Su-30, Su-33, Su-34, Su-35, and Su-37.

Since 1998, the export Su-27SK has been produced as the Shenyang J-11 in China under licence. The first licensed-production plane, assembled in Shenyang from Russian supplied kits, was flight tested on 16 December 1998. These licence-built versions, which numbered 100, were designated J-11A. The next model, the J-11B made extensive use of Chinese developed systems within the Su-27SK airframe.

Starting in 2004, the Russian Air Force began a major update of the original Soviet Su-27 ('Flanker-B') fleet. The upgraded variants were designated Su-27SM (Russian for "Seriyniy Modernizovanniy" - literally "Serial Modernized"). This included upgrades in air-to-air capability with the R-77 missile with an active radar homing head. The modernized Su-27SM fighters belong to the 4+ generation. The strike capability was enhanced with the addition of the Kh-29T/TE/L and Kh-31P/Kh-31A ASM and KAB-500KR/KAB-1500KR smart bombs. The avionics were also upgraded. The Russian Air Force is currently receiving aircraft modernized to the SM3 standard. The aircraft's efficiency to hit air and ground targets has increased 2 and 3 times than in the basic Su-27 variant. Su-27SM3 has two additional stations under the wing and a much stronger airframe. The aircraft is equipped with new onboard radio-electronic systems and a wider range of applicable air weapons. The aircraft's cockpit has multifunctional displays.

The Su-30 is a two-seat multi-role version developed from the Su-27UBK and was designed for export and evolved into two main variants. The export variant for China, the SU-30MKK ('Flanker-G') which first flew in 1999. The other variant developed as the export version for India, the Su-30MKI ('Flanker-H') was delivered in 2002 and has at least five other configurations.

The Su-33 is the Russian Navy version of the Soviet Su-27K which was redesignated by the Sukhoi Design Bureau after 1991. Both have the NATO designation 'Flanker-D'.

The Su-34 is the Russian derivative of the Soviet-era Su-27IB, which evolved from the Soviet Navy Su-27KUB operational conversion trainer. It was previously referred to as the Su-32MF.

The newest and most advanced version of the Su-27 is the Su-35S ("Serial"). The Su-35 was previously referred to as the Su-27M, Su-27SM2, and Su-35BM.

The Su-37 is an advanced technology demonstrator derived from Su-35 prototypes, featuring thrust vectoring nozzles made of titanium rather than steel and an updated airframe containing a high proportion of carbon-fibre and Al-Li alloy. Only two examples were built and in 2002 one crashed, effectively ending the program. The Su-37 improvements did however make it into new Flanker variants such as the Su-35S and the Su-30MKI.

== Design ==
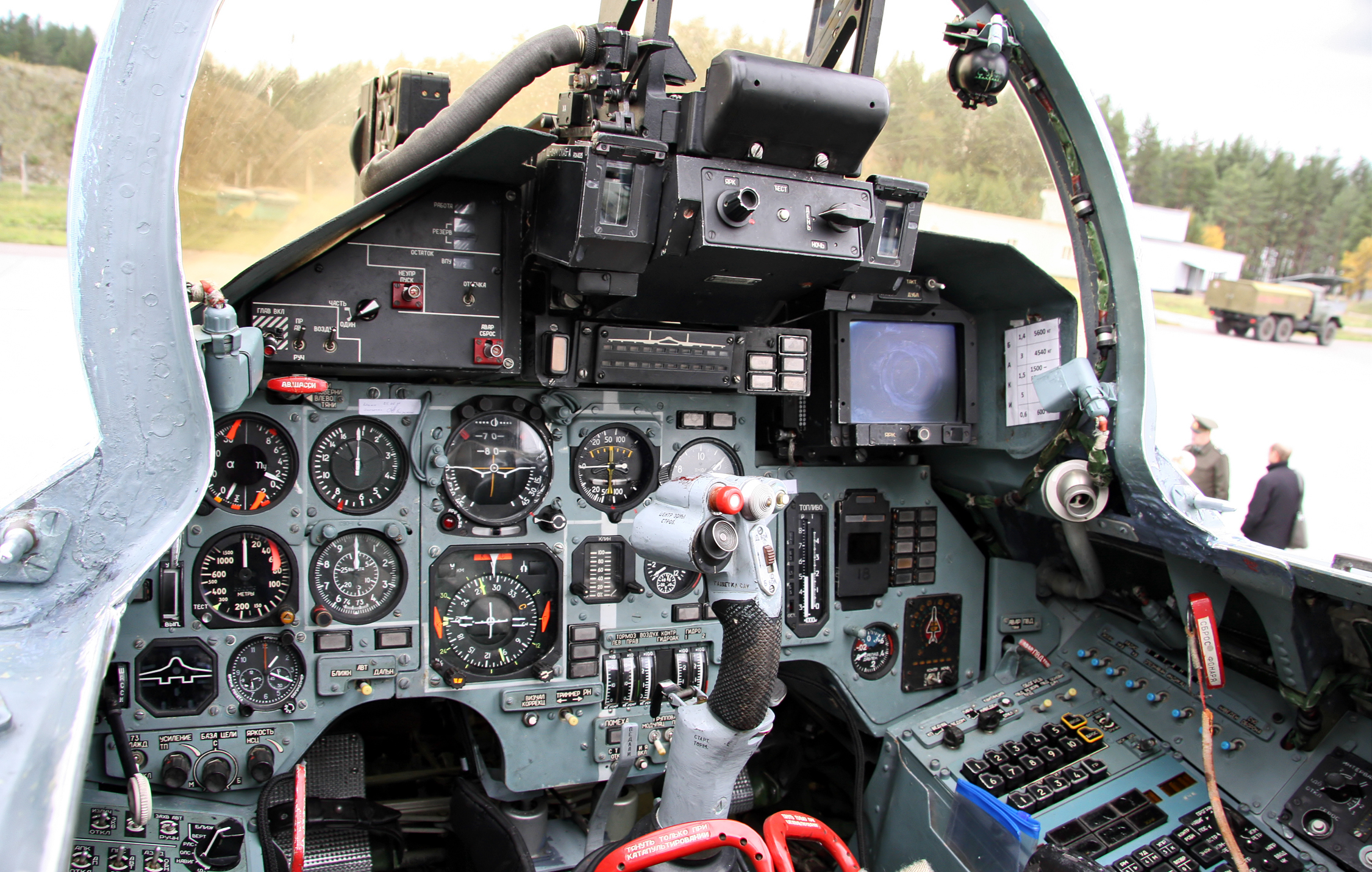
Cockpit

The Su-27's basic design is aerodynamically similar to the MiG-29, but it is substantially larger. The wings are attached to the center of the fuselage at the leading edge extensions, featuring a semi-delta design, with the tips cropped for missile rails or ECM pods. The fighter is also an example of a tailed delta wing configuration, retaining conventional horizontal tailplanes.

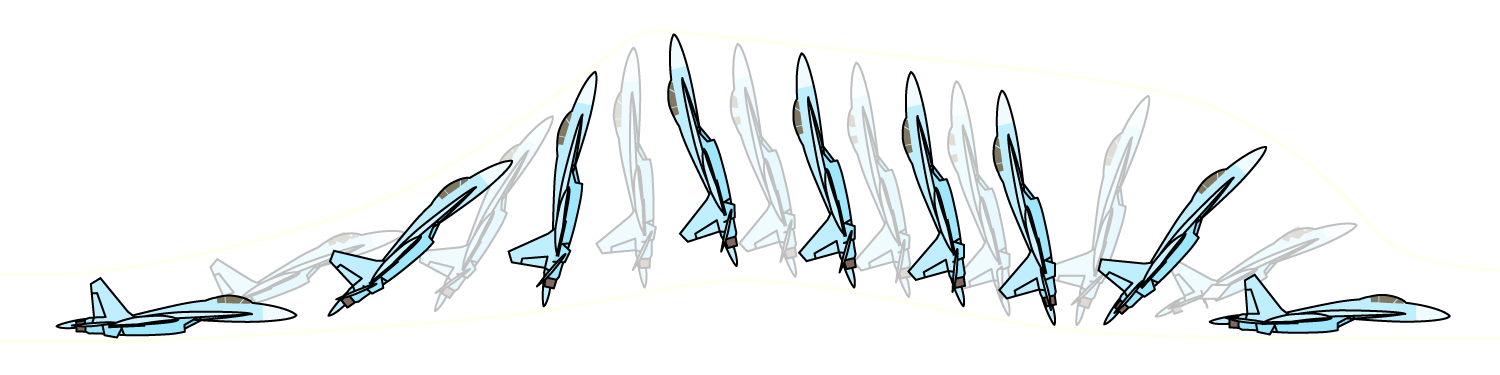
Sketch of Su-27 performing a Cobra maneuver

The Su-27 had the Soviet Union's first operational fly-by-wire control system, based on the Sukhoi OKB's experience with the T-4 bomber project. Combined with relatively low wing loading and powerful basic flight controls, it makes for an exceptionally agile aircraft, controllable even at very low speeds and high angle of attack. In airshows the aircraft has demonstrated its maneuverability with a Cobra maneuver – or dynamic deceleration – briefly sustained level flight at a 120° angle of attack.

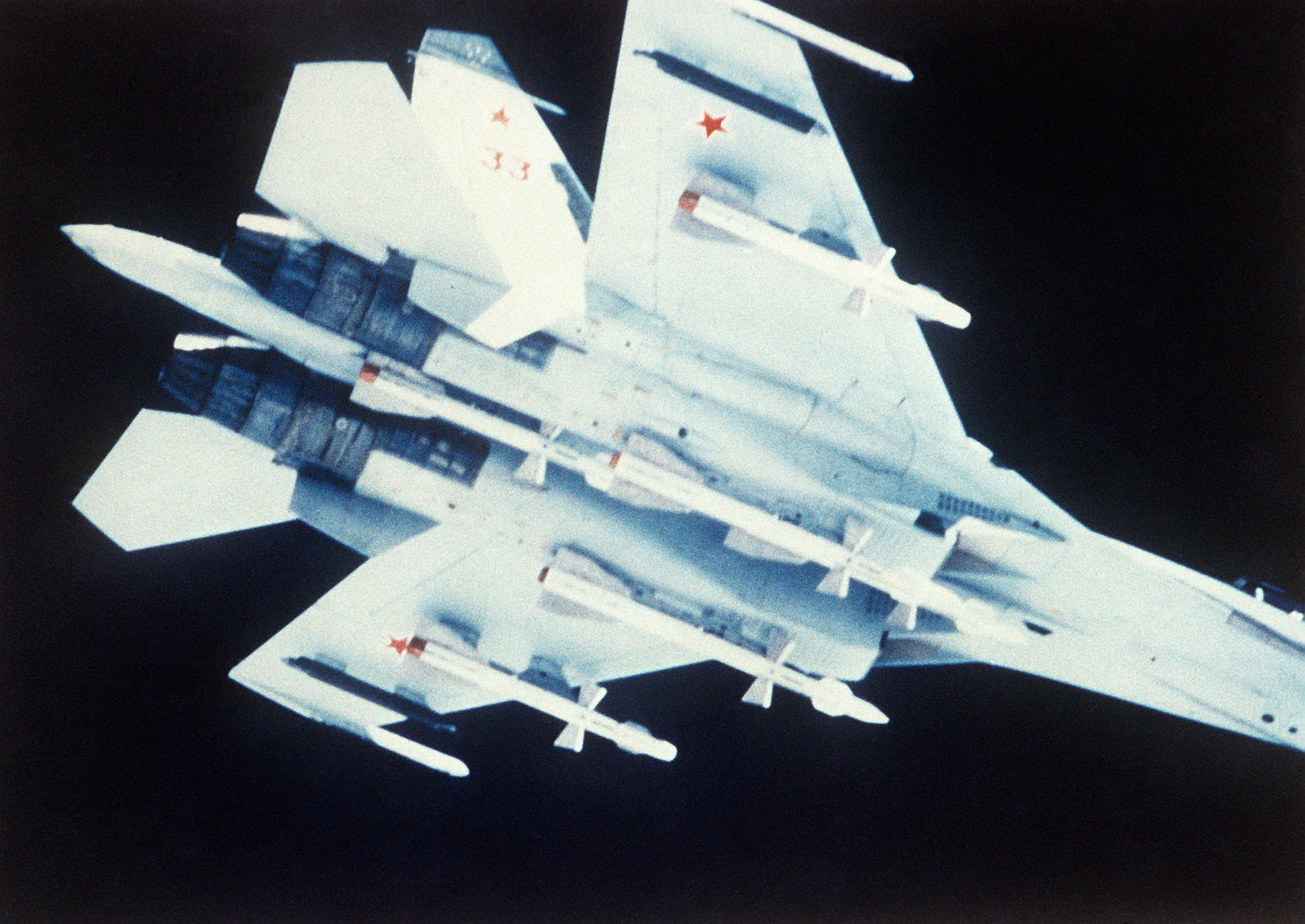
Su-27 carrying Vympel R-27 missiles

The naval version of the 'Flanker', the Su-27K (or Su-33), incorporates canards for additional lift, reducing takeoff distances. These canards have also been incorporated in some Su-30s, the Su-35, and the Su-37.

The Su-27 is equipped with a Phazotron N001 Myech coherent Pulse-Doppler radar with track while scan and look-down/shoot-down capability. The fighter also has an OLS-27 infrared search and track (IRST) system in the nose just forward of the cockpit with an 80–100 km (50–62 mi) range.

The Su-27 is armed with a single 30 mm (1.18 in) Gryazev-Shipunov GSh-30-1 cannon in the starboard wingroot, and has up to 10 hardpoints for missiles and other weapons. Its standard missile armament for air-to-air combat is a mixture of R-73 (AA-11 Archer) and R-27 (AA-10 'Alamo') missiles, the latter including extended range and infrared homing models.

== Operational history ==
=== Soviet Union and Russia ===
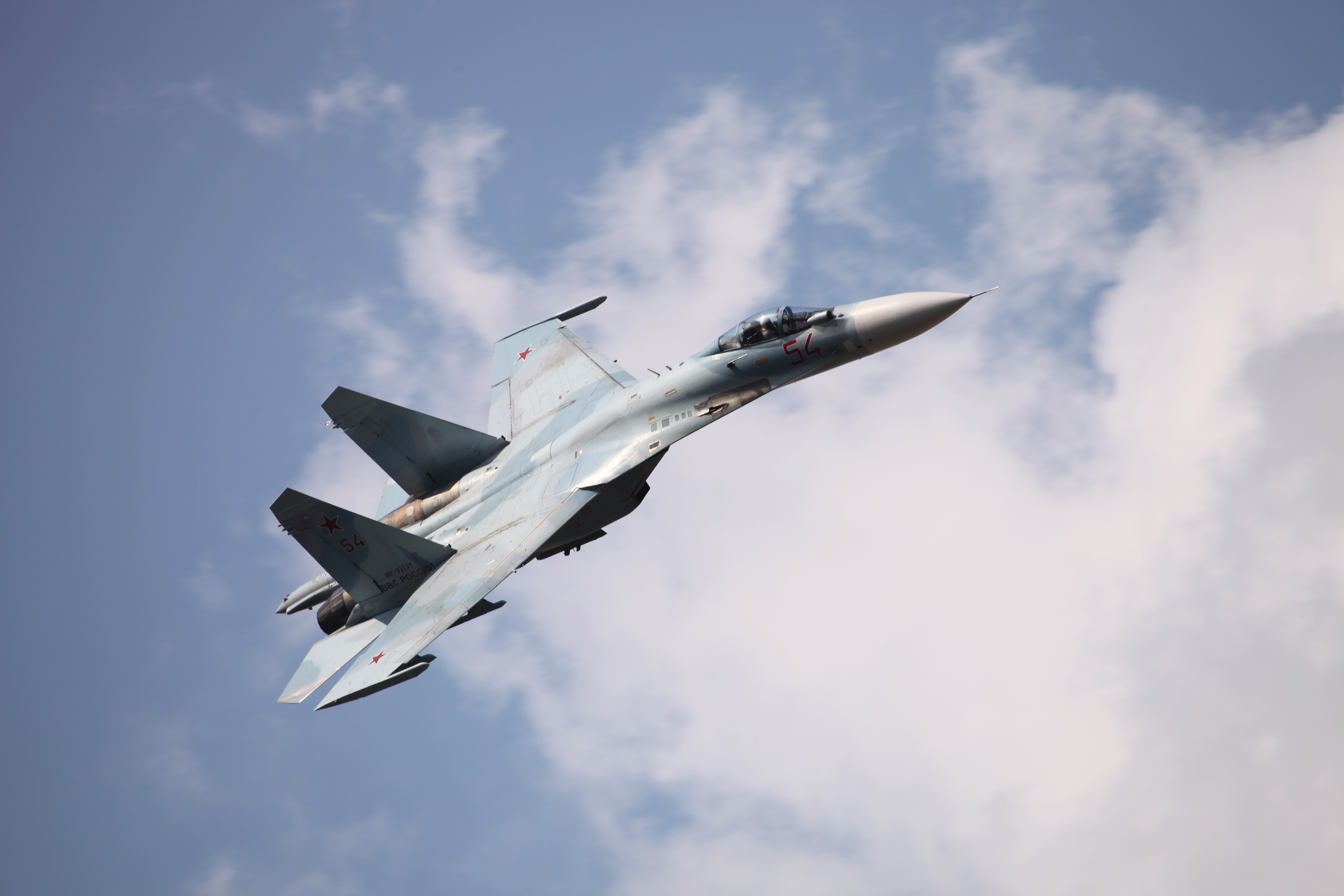
Russian Su-27SM3

The Soviet Air Force began receiving Su-27s in June 1985. The first frontline unit to receive the Su-27 was the 831st Fighter Aviation Regiment at Myrhorod Air Base, Ukrainian SSR, in November 1985. It officially entered service in August 1990.

On 13 September 1987, a fully armed Soviet Su-27, Red 36, intercepted a Norwegian Lockheed P-3 Orion maritime patrol aircraft flying over the Barents Sea. The Soviet fighter performed different close passes, colliding with the P-3 on the third pass. The Su-27 disengaged and both aircraft landed safely at their bases.

These aircraft were used by the Russian Air Force during the 1992–1993 war in Abkhazia against Georgian forces. One fighter, piloted by Major Vatslav Aleksandrovich Shipko (Вацлав Александрович Шипко) was reported shot down in friendly fire by an S-75M Dvina on 19 March 1993 while intercepting Georgian Su-25s performing close air support. The pilot was killed.

In the 2008 South Ossetia War, Russia used Su-27s to gain airspace control over Tskhinvali, the capital city of South Ossetia.

On 7 February 2013, two Su-27s briefly entered Japanese airspace off Rishiri Island near Hokkaido, flying south over the Sea of Japan before turning back to the north. Four Mitsubishi F-2 fighters were scrambled to visually confirm the Russian planes, warning them by radio to leave their airspace. A photo taken by a JASDF pilot of one of the two Su-27s was released by the Japan Ministry of Defense. Russia denied the incursion, saying the jets were making routine flights near the disputed Kuril Islands.

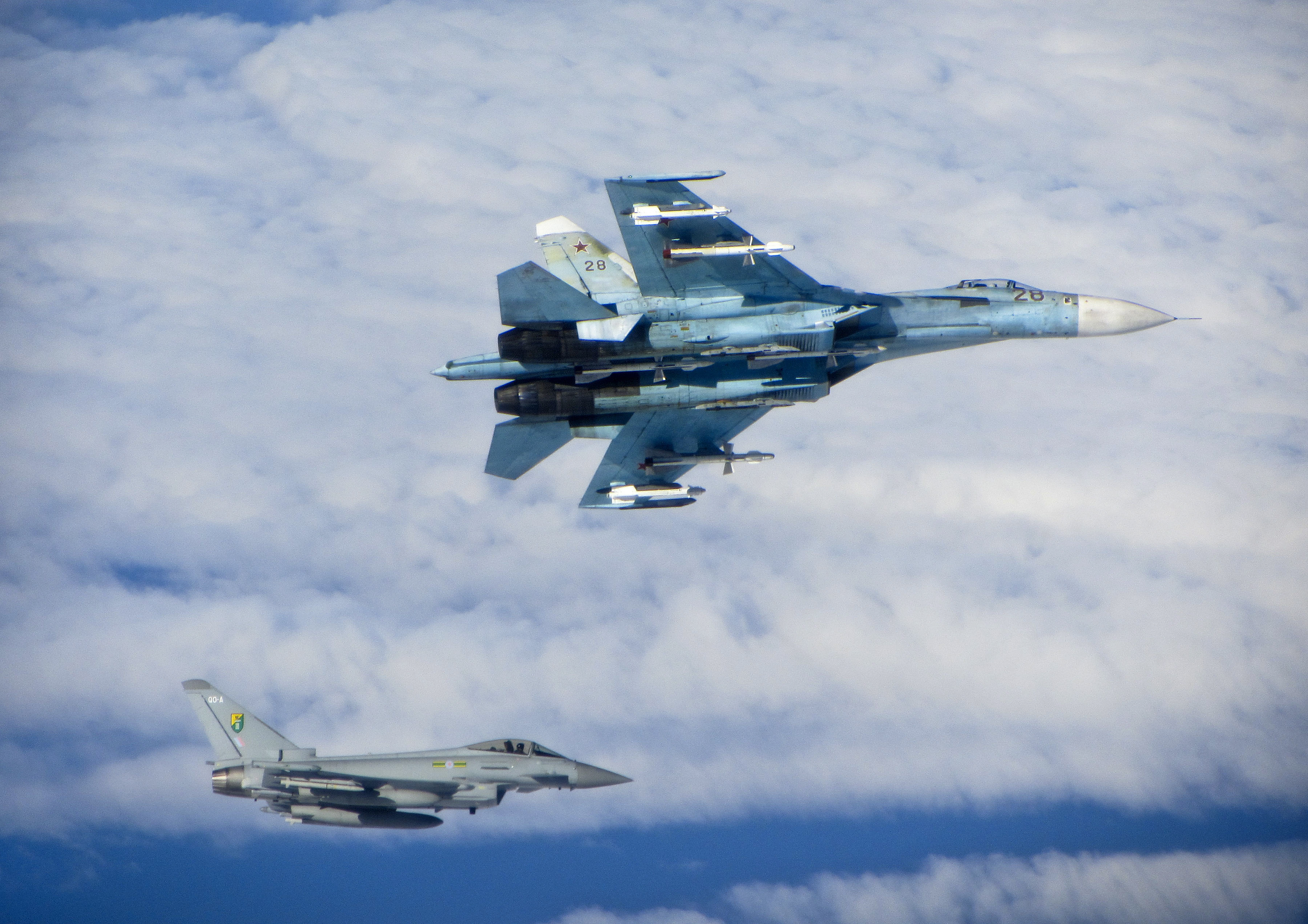
A Russian Su-27 and a British Typhoon meet over the Baltic, June 2014

Russia plans to replace the Su-27 and the Mikoyan MiG-29 eventually with the Sukhoi Su-57 fifth-generation multi-role twin-engine fighter.

A squadron of Su-27SM3s was deployed to Syria in November 2015 as part of the Russian military intervention in the Syrian Civil War.

A Russian Su-27 crashed over the Black Sea on 25 March 2020, in mysterious circumstances. The pilot was not found, after a large-scale rescue effort hampered by inclement weather involving four helicopters, 11 civilian and military vessels, and several drones. The plane's last location was some 50 kilometers from the city of Feodosia.

=== China ===
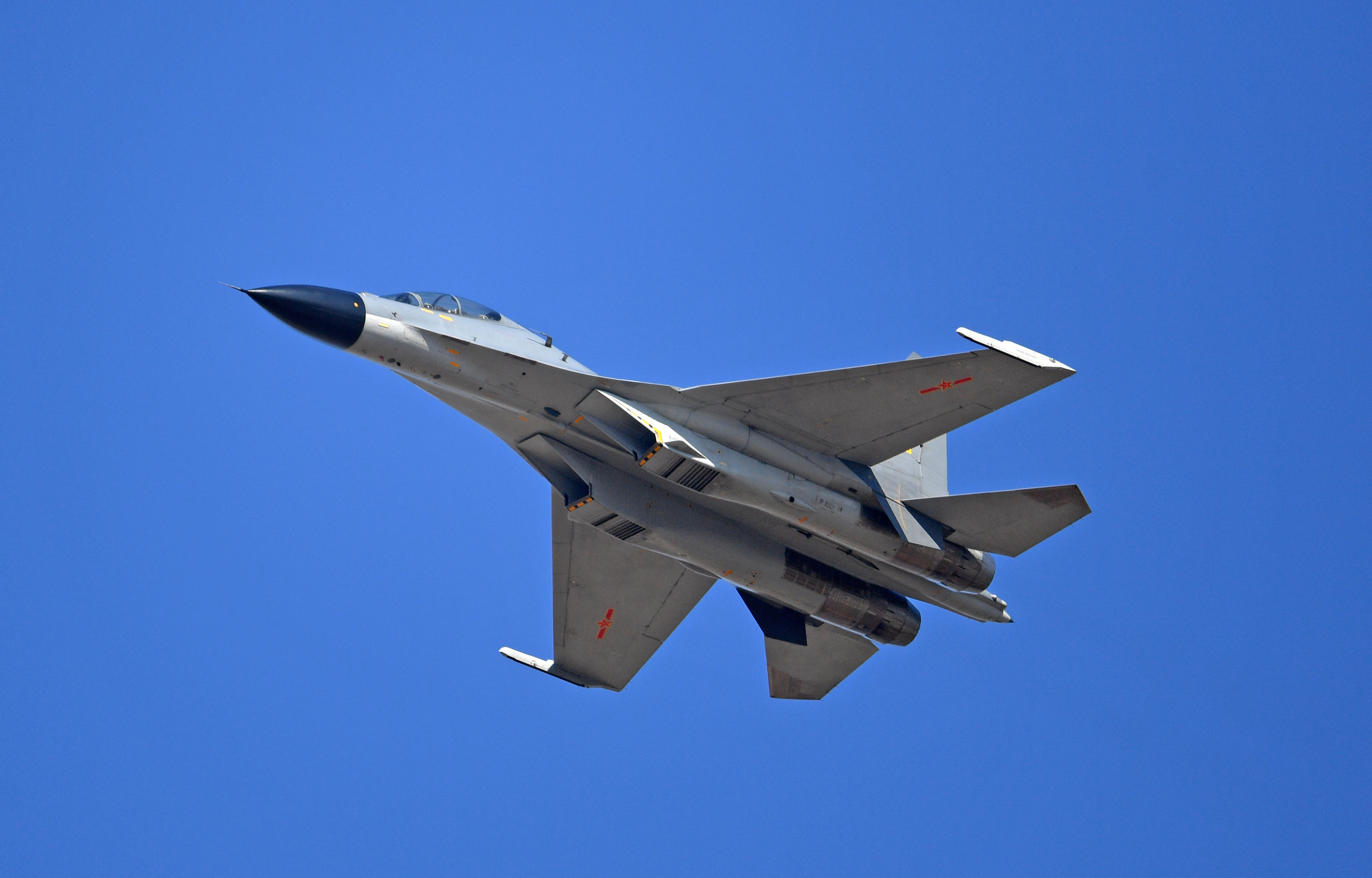
PLAAF J-11BS

China was the Su-27's first export customer; and the only customer to be offered and sold the Su-27 before the collapse of the Soviet Union. China received a total of 76 Soviet/Russian-built aircraft - 36 Su-27SKs and 40 Su-27UBKs.

Negotiations with the Soviet Union started in June 1990 for the MiG-29 and Su-24; by October, China was interested in the more-capable Su-27. China called the purchase "906 Project". In February 1991, a Su-27 performed a flight demonstration at Beijing's Nanyuan Airport.

China ordered 24 Su-27s, weapons and a flight simulator in May 1991. 70% of the payment was in barter with "poor quality" light industrial goods and food; the poor state of the Soviet economy strengthened China's negotiating position. A 1995 estimate of the cost was $1.3-1.5 billion. The first 12 aircraft - eight Su-27SKs and four Su-27UBKs - were delivered in late-1991. 12 were delivered in 1992. The first batch was stationed at the Wuhu Air Base in the early 1990s. These were equipped with N001E radar and could engage one target at a time; later batches used the N001P and could engage two targets at a time. Two more - possibly Su-27UB trainers - were ordered or received by end of 1992. In December 1999, China ordered 28 Su–27UBKs as trainers. The first 12 were delivered in December 2000. The remainder were delivered by September 2009.

In 1995, the terms of payment were and scope of the agreement changed. China agreed to pay only with US dollars, and Russia agreed to allow China to license-produce the Su-27 as the J-11; the Russian negotiators were not authorized by the Russian government to agree to the latter. China received 18 Su-27SKs and 6 Su–27UBKs in 1995–1996.

Through 2012, China's Su-27s could not fire the R-77 air-to-air missile due to limitations to their fire control systems.

=== Ethiopia ===
Ethiopia ordered its first Su-27s in 1998 from Russia, with a deal signed for eight surplus Su-27s (including two Su-27UB Trainers) for $150 Million as part of a modernisation drive during its war with Eritrea. The first of these Su-27s was disassembled at Krasnodar and loaded onto an Antonov An-22 in December and delivered later that same month. The first batch of Ethiopian pilots were trained at Debre-Zeit by Russians (in 1999 or afterwards) and following the training of a second batch, the 5th Fighter Squadron was officially re-raised, also at Debre-Zeit. The first accident of the Su-27 in Ethiopian service occurred in December 1998 when Fl Lt. Abaniyeh crashed during a night flying exercise, killing its pilot. A second loss occurred on the 6th of January 1999 when a Su-27US flown by Col (retd.)Vyecheslaw Myzin (a Russian instructor) crashed during a post-assembly flight check, with the pilot managing to eject safely. This aircraft was replaced by another aircraft from RuAF stocks within days by Promexport. On 29 August 1999, an Ethiopian Air Force Su-27 claimed to have shot down a South African Learjet 35A (N350JF) using a R-73 missile. The Su-27 has replaced the aging Mikoyan-Gurevich MiG-21, which was the main air superiority fighter of the ETAF between 1977 and 1999.

==== Badme War ====
Ethiopian Su-27s are confirmed to have shot down two Eritrean MiG-29s and damaged another one during the Eritrean-Ethiopian War in February 1999 (one damaged on the 21st of February, one shot down on the 25th and one on the 26th) and claimed another two in May 2000 (which are denied by Eritrea). Ethiopia claims a total of seven MiG-29s downed during the conflict, however only two to four are confirmable. The Su-27s were also used in combat air patrol (CAP) missions, suppression of air defense, and providing escort for fighters on bombing and reconnaissance missions.

==== Tigray War ====
Ethiopian government used its Su-27s for bombing targets during the Tigray War. Ethiopian Su-27s were depicted armed with OFAB-250 unguided bombs and over the skies of Mekelle. On 25 August 2022, Ethiopian authorities claimed an An-26 was intercepted and then shot down by an ETAF Su-27, scrambled to investigate the airspace violation incoming from Sudan.

=== Angola ===
The Su-27 entered Angolan service in mid-2000 during the Angolan Civil War. It is reported that one Su-27 in the process of landing, was shot down by 9K34 Strela-3 MANPADs fired by UNITA forces on 19 November 2000.

=== Indonesia ===
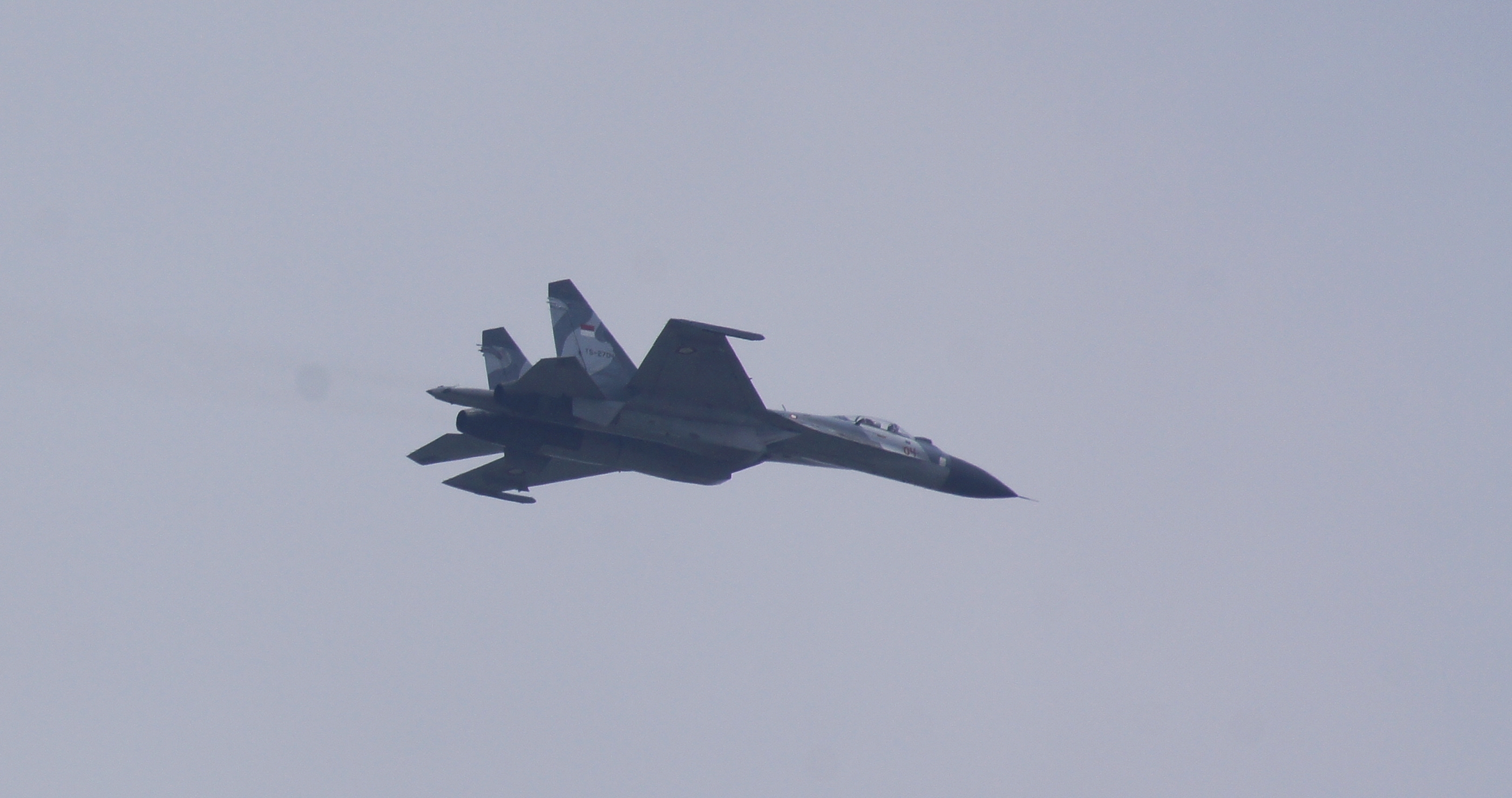
Indonesian Air Force Sukhoi Su-27SKM Flanker

Four Indonesian Flanker-type fighters including Su-27s participated for the first time in the biennial Exercise Pitch Black exercise in Australia on 27 July 2012. Arriving at Darwin, Australia, the two Su-27s and two Sukhoi Su-30s were escorted by two Australian F/A-18 Hornets of No. 77 Squadron, Royal Australian Air Force. Exercise Pitch Black 12 was conducted from 27 July through 17 August 2012, and involved 2,200 personnel and up to 94 aircraft from Australia, Indonesia, Singapore, Thailand, New Zealand and the United States.

=== Ukraine ===
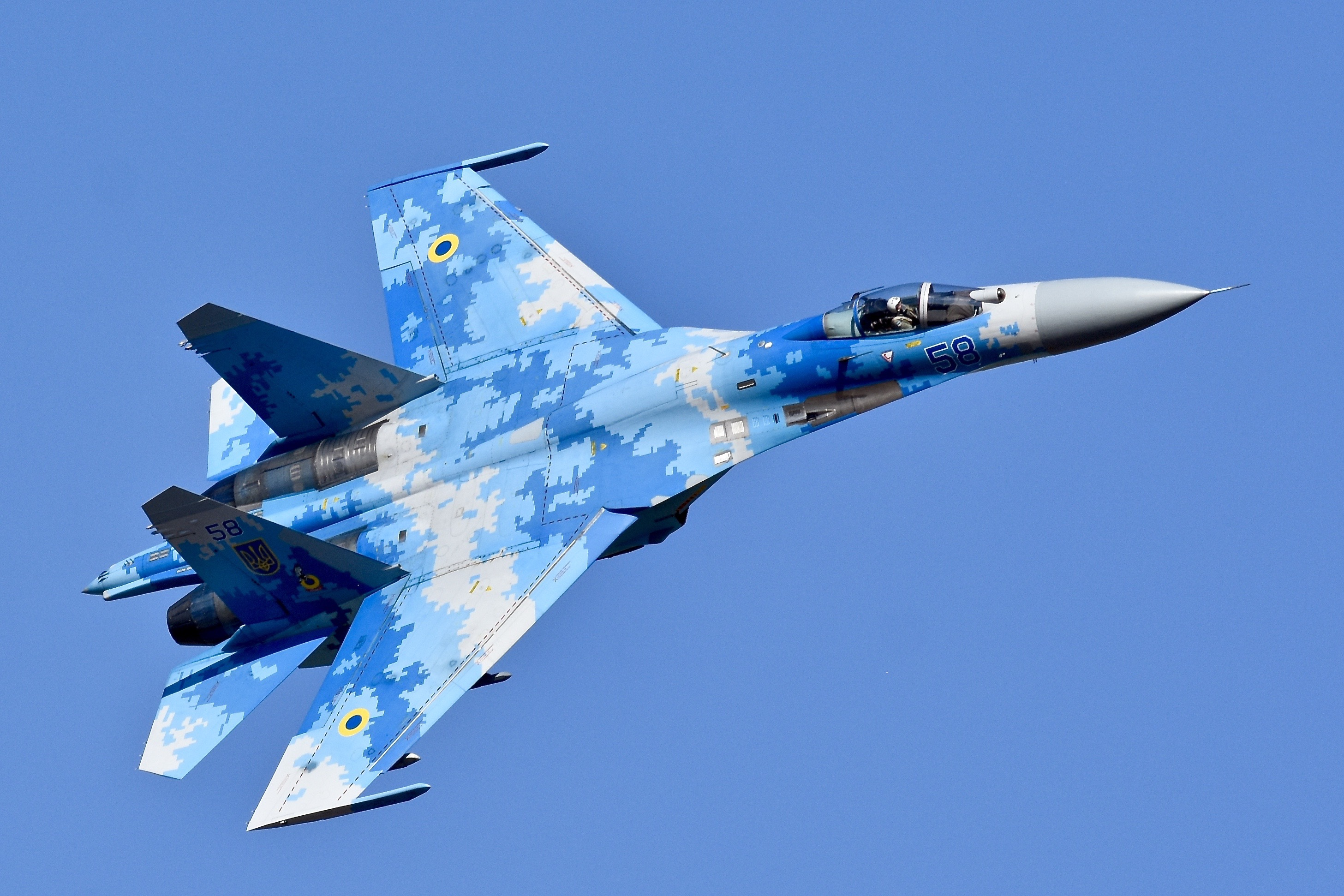
Ukrainian Air Force Su-27P arrives at the 2018 RIAT, England

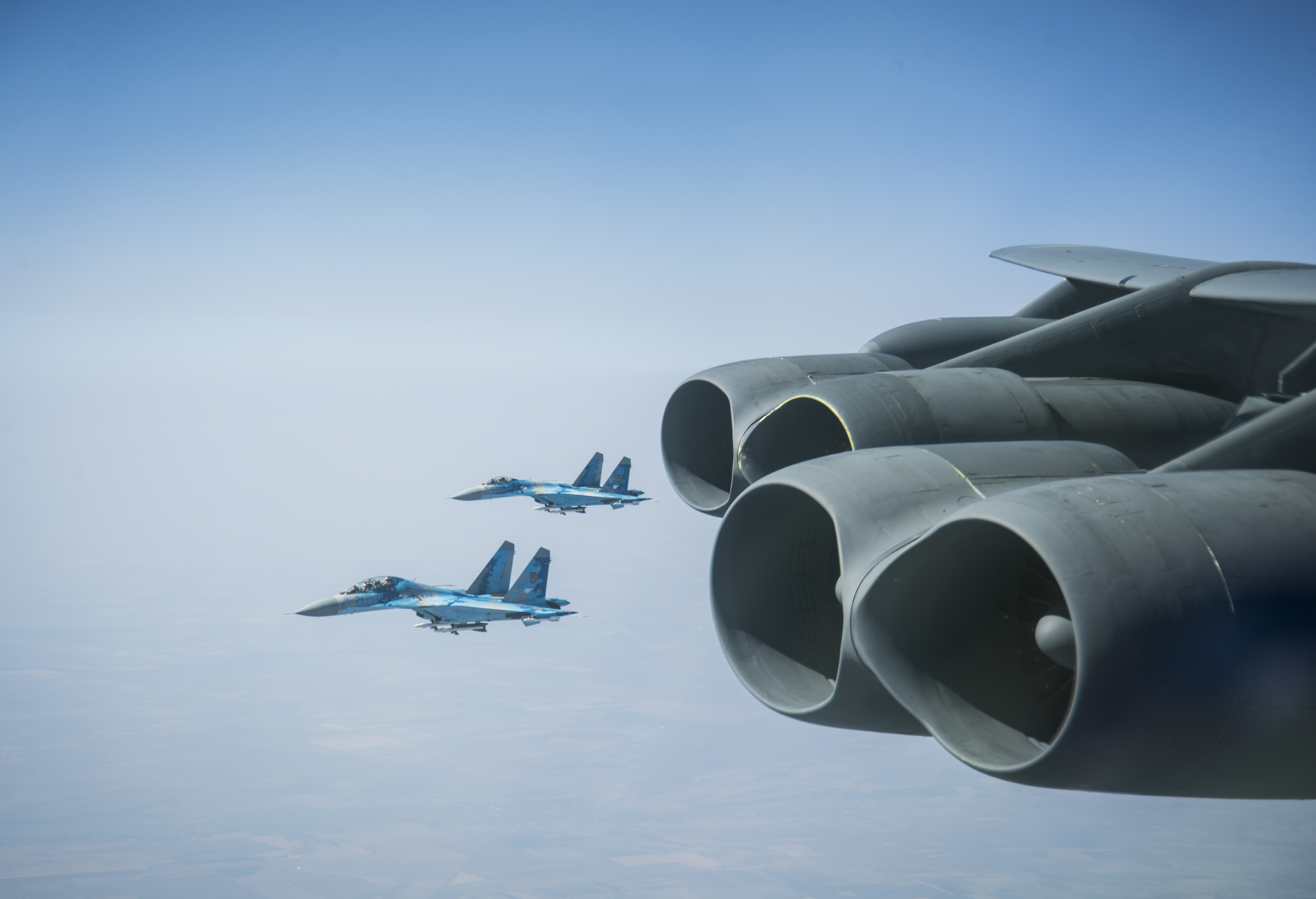
B-52H assigned to the 5th Bomb Wing integrates with Ukrainian Su-27s during a Bomber Task Force Europe mission, 23 September 2020

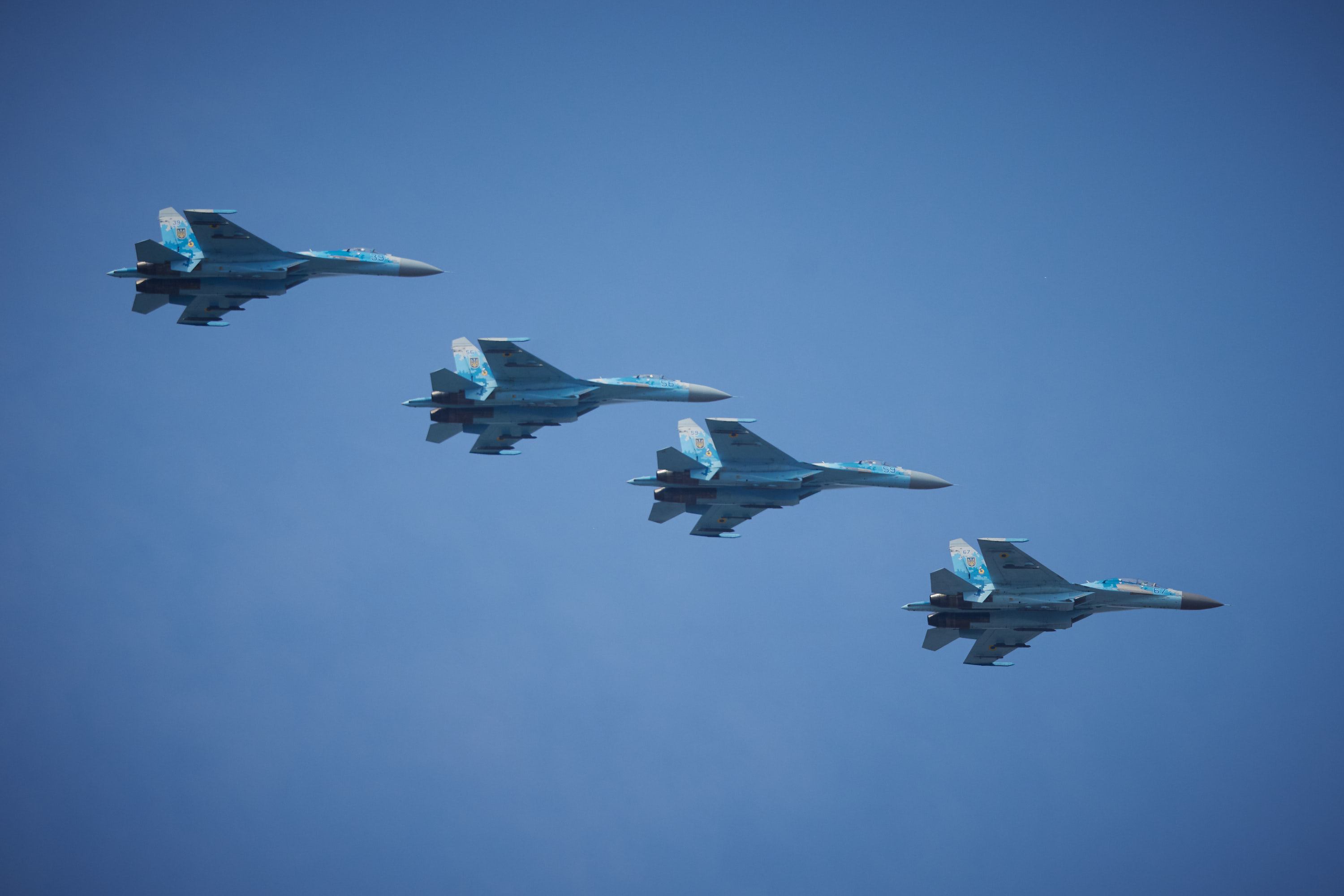
Ukrainian Su-27s perform a flypast during the Kyiv Independence Day Parade on 24 August 2021.

The Ukrainian Air Force inherited about 66-70 Su-27 aircraft after the collapse of the Soviet Union. Lack of funds in addition to the Su-27's high maintenance requirements led to a shortage of spare parts and inadequate servicing with approximately 34 in service as of 2019. Years of underfunding meant that the air force has not received a new Su-27 since 1991. Between 2007 and 2017, as many as 65 combat jets were sold abroad, including nine Su-27s. In 2009, amid declining relations with Russia, the Ukrainian Air Force began to have difficulty obtaining spare parts from Sukhoi. Only 19 Su-27s were serviceable at the time of the Russian annexation of Crimea and subsequent War in Donbas in 2014. Following the Russian invasion, Ukraine increased its military budget, allowing stored Su-27s to be returned to service.

The Zaporizhzhya Aircraft Repair Plant "MiGremont" in Zaporizhzhia began modernizing the Su-27 to NATO standards in 2012, which involved a minor overhaul of the radar, navigation and communication equipment. Aircraft with this modification are designated Su-27P1M and Su-27UB1M. The Ministry of Defence accepted the project on 5 August 2014, and the first two aircraft were officially handed over to the 831st Tactical Aviation Brigade in October 2015. Despite the modernization, the avionics and missiles of the Ukrainian Su-27s were still "two generations behind" those of the Russians.

In 2014, during the Annexation of Crimea, a Ukrainian Air Force Su-27 was scrambled to intercept Russian fighter jets over Ukraine's airspace over the Black Sea on 3 March. With no aerial opposition and other aircraft available for ground attack duties, Ukrainian Su-27s played only a small role in the war in Donbas until 24 February 2022. Ukrainian Su-27s were recorded performing low fly passes and were reported flying top cover, combat air patrols and eventual escort or intercept of civil aviation traffic over Eastern Ukraine. Videos taken of low-flying Su-27s involved in the operation revealed they were armed with R-27 and R-73 air-to-air missiles.

There were two fatal crashes involving Ukrainian Su-27s in 2018. On 16 October, a Ukrainian Su-27UB1M flown by Colonel Ivan Petrenko crashed during the Ukraine-USAF exercise "Clear Sky 2018" based at Starokostiantyniv Air Base. The second seat was occupied by Lieutenant Colonel Seth Nehring, a pilot of the 144th Fighter Wing of the California Air National Guard. Both pilots died in the crash, that happened about 5:00 p.m. local time in the Khmelnytskyi province of western Ukraine. On 15 December, an Su-27 crashed on final approach about 2 km (1 mi) from Ozerne Air Base in Zhytomyr Oblast, after performing a training flight. Major Fomenko Alexander Vasilyevich was killed.

On 29 May 2020, Ukrainian Su-27s took part in the Bomber Task Force in Europe with B-1B bombers for the first time in the Black Sea region. On 4 September 2020, three B-52 bombers from the 5th Bomb Wing, Minot Air Force Base, North Dakota, conducted vital integration training with Ukrainian MiG-29s and Su-27s inside Ukraine's airspace.

==== Russo-Ukrainian War ====
===== Russian invasion of Ukraine =====
The Su-27 was used by both sides in the Russian invasion of Ukraine. On 24 February 2022, a Ukrainian Su-27 and a refueling vehicle were burned out by fire after a Russian attack on Ozerne Air Base in Zhytomyr District during the first day of the Russian invasion of Ukraine. The next day, another Su-27 was shot down in Kyiv by a Russian S-400 system and was recorded by residents on their cell phones and published on Twitter; its pilot, Colonel Oleksandr Oksanchenko, was killed. A third Su-27 was reported lost by Ukrainian officials over Kropyvnytskyi, in central Ukraine; its pilot was killed.

On 7 May 2022, a pair of Ukrainian Su-27s conducted a high-speed, low-level bombing run on Russian-occupied Snake Island; the attack was captured on film by a Bayraktar TB2 drone.

On 7 June 2022, a Ukrainian Su-27, bort number 38 blue, was shot down while flying at low altitude near Orikhiv in Zaporizhzhia Oblast. The aircraft was reportedly destroyed either by an enemy air-to-air missile or due to friendly fire.

On 21 August 2022, a Ukrainian Su-27 was reported lost in combat. The pilot died.

In September 2022, a Ukrainian Su-27 was spotted with American-made AGM-88 HARM anti-radiation missiles.

On 13 October 2022, one Ukrainian Su-27 from the 39th Tactical Aviation Brigade was lost during a combat mission in Poltava Oblast, the pilot died.

On 10 March 2023, a Russian Su-27 was damaged in a partisan attack on Uglovoye airfield in Primorsky Krai, Russia. The video of a burning airplane was posted by the Freedom of Russia Legion.

On 14 March 2023, a Russian Su-27 intercepted an American MQ-9 Reaper drone and performed several passes, dumping fuel onto it before colliding with it, causing the drone to crash into the Black Sea.

In August 2023, it was revealed that Ukrainian Su-27s had started carrying JDAM-ER guided bombs.

On 17 May 2024, a Ukrainian Su-27 was shot down in the vicinity of Metalivka, Chuhuiv Raion, during the Kharkiv offensive. The pilot, Lt Col Denys Vasyliuk, was killed. The aircraft was an upgraded Su-27UP2M, which was still undergoing tests prior to the Russian invasion.

As of 24 October 2025, Ukraine has lost 17 Su-27 and Russia lost 3 Su-27.

On 28 April 2025, a Ukrainian Su-27 was lost in an accident "while repelling a drone attack"; the pilot ejected safely. A commission has been established to investigate the cause of the incident.

=== Potential operators ===
==== North Korea ====
According to Admiral Samuel Paparo, commander of the United States Indo-Pacific Command, North Korea is set to receive an unknown number of Su-27 and MiG-29 aircraft from Russia in exchange for Pyongyang sending troops for the war in Ukraine. The War Zone states that Russia is unlikely to transfer them in the short term at least.

== Variants ==
=== Soviet era ===
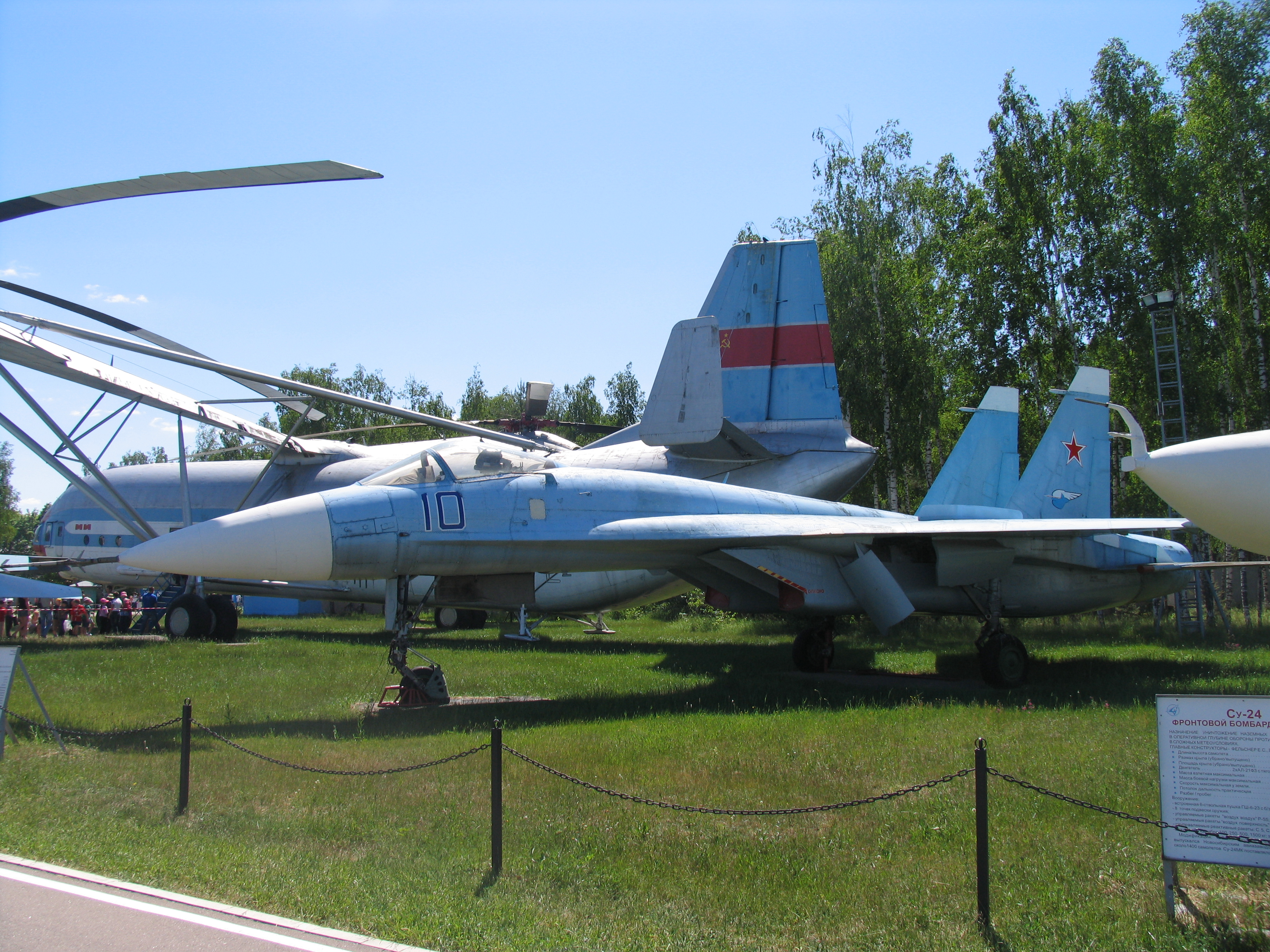
Initial T-10 prototype

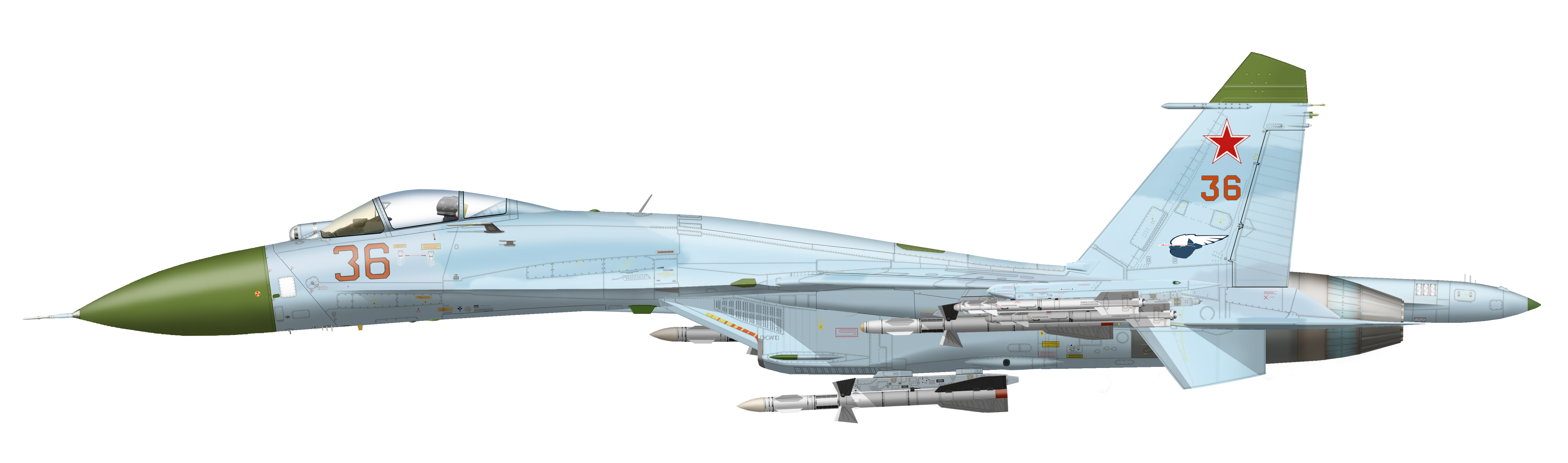
Left side scheme of a Sukhoi Su-27 Flanker B, first production series

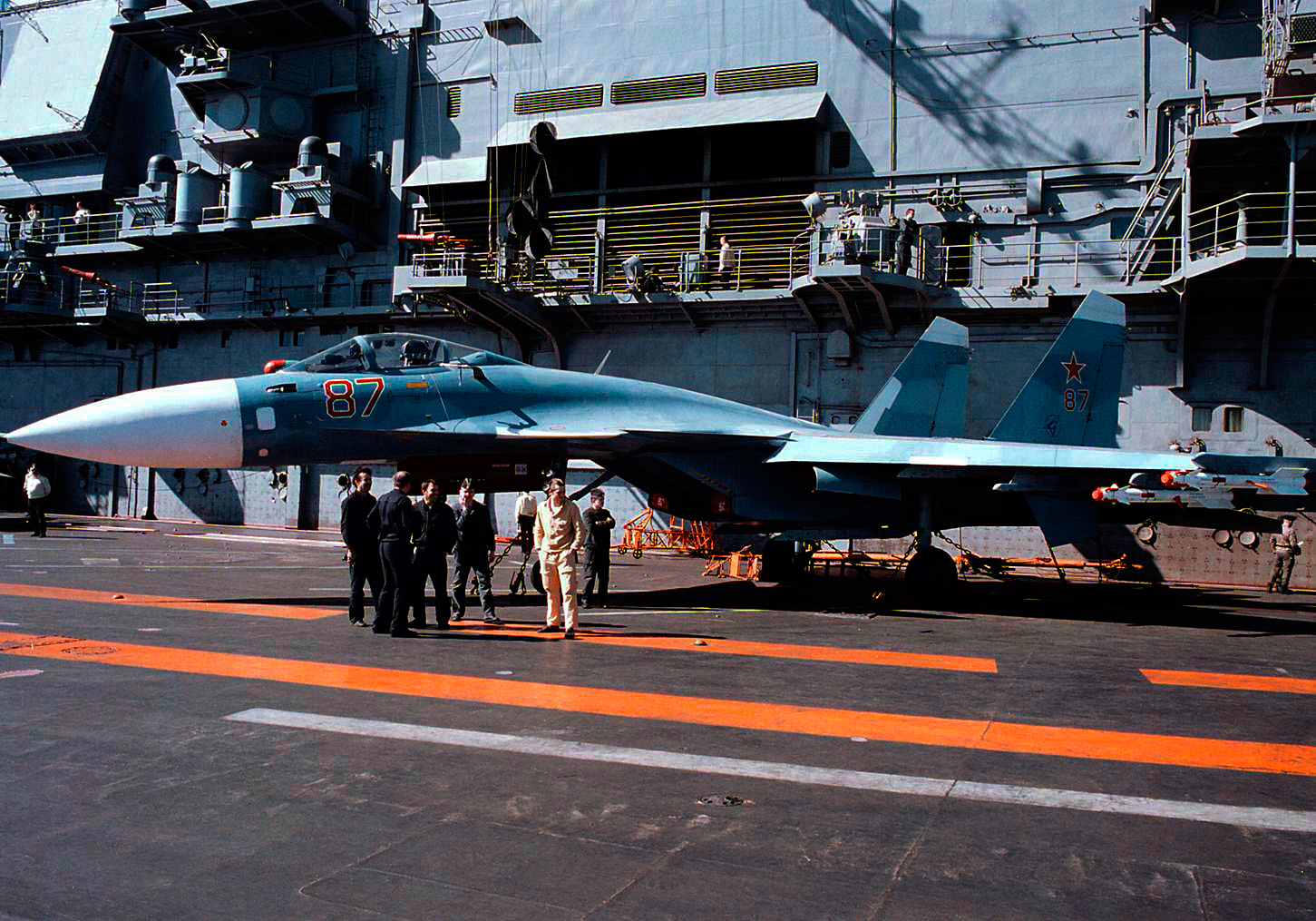
Russian fighter Su-27K (later renamed to Su-33) on the deck of Admiral Kuznetsov

T-10 ("Flanker-A")
Initial prototype configuration.
T-10S ("Flanker-A")
Improved prototype configuration, more similar to production specification.
P-42
Special version built to beat climb time records. The aircraft had all armament, radar and paint removed, which reduced weight to 14,100 kg (31,100 lb). It also had improved engines. Similar to the US F-15 Streak Eagle project. Between 1986 and 1988, it established and took several climb records from the Streak Eagle. Several of these records (such as time to climb to 3,000 m, 6,000 m, 9,000 m, and 12,000 m) still stands current as of 2019.

Su-27 ("Flanker-A")
Pre-production series built in small numbers with AL-31 engine.
Su-27S (Su-27 / "Flanker-B")
Initial production single-seater with improved AL-31F engine. The "T-10P".
Su-27P (Su-27 / "Flanker-B")
Standard version but without air-to-ground weapons control system and wiring and assigned to Soviet Air Defence Forces units. Often designated Su-27 without -P.
Su-27UB ("Flanker-C")
Initial production two-seat operational conversion trainer.
Su-27K (Su-33 / "Flanker-D")
Carrier-based single-seater with folding wings, high-lift devices, and arresting gear, built in small numbers (<20) They followed the "T-10K" prototypes and demonstrators.
Su-27KUB (Su-33UB)
Two-seat training-and-combat version based on the Su-27K and Su-27KU, with a side-by-side seating same as Su-34. One prototype built.
Su-27KM
A projected carrier–based fighter from the base Su-27 fighter that featured reverse-swept wings that was later implicated into the similar Su-47.
Su-27M (Su-35/Su-37 / "Flanker-E/F")
Improved demonstrators for an advanced single-seat multi-role Su-27S derivative. These also included a two-seat "Su-35UB" demonstrator.
Su-27PU (Su-30 / "Flanker-C")
Two-seat version of the Su-27P interceptor, designed to support other single-seat Su-27P, MiG-31 and other interceptor aircraft in PVO service, with tactical data. The model was later renamed to Su-30, and modified into a multi-role fighter mainly for export market, moving away from the original purpose of the aircraft.
Su-32 (Su-27IB)
Two-seat dedicated long-range strike variant with side-by-side seating in "platypus" nose. Prototype of Su-32FN and Su-34.

=== Post-Soviet era ===
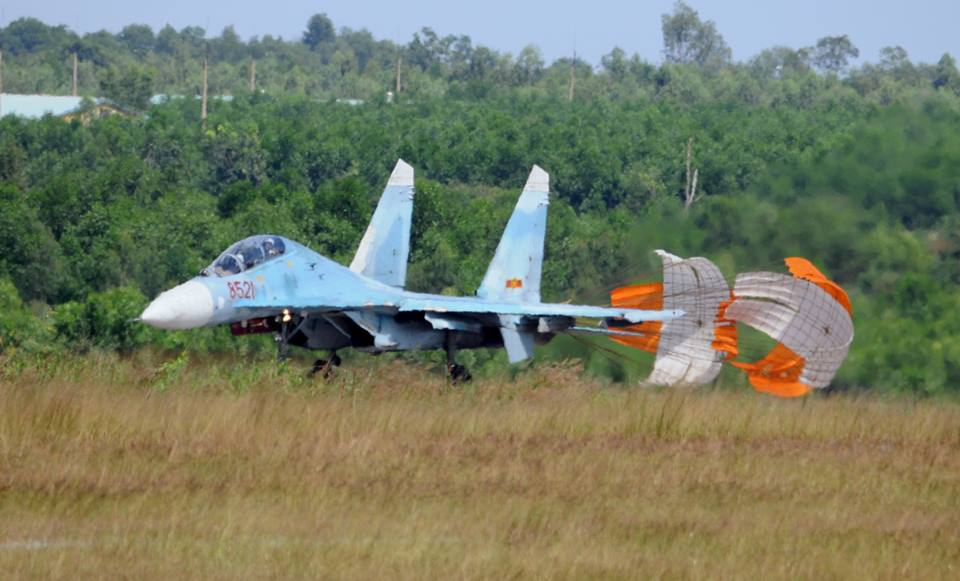
Vietnam People's Air Force Su-27UBK with a drogue parachute

Su-27PD ("Flanker-B")
Single-seat demonstrator with improvements such as in-flight refuelling probe.
Su-30M/MK/MKK/MK2 ("Flanker-G")
Next-generation multi-role two–seat fighter. A few Su-30Ms were built for Russian evaluation in the mid-1990s, though little came of the effort. The Su-30MK export variant was embodied as a series of two demonstrators of different levels of capability. Variants include Su-30MKK for PLAAF (China), and also the Su-30MK2 for Uganda, Vietnam, and other nations.
Su-30MKI/MKM/MKA/SM/SME/SM2 ("Flanker-H")
Highly upgraded with new Saturn AL-31FP engines with 3D Thrust-Vectoring controls, and canards to add to the same, both of which are inspired by the Sukhoi Su-34 "Fullback" and the Sukhoi Su-37 "Terminator". Versions include the Su-30MKI for India, Su-30MKA for Algeria, and Su-30MKM for Malaysia, followed by the new Su-30SM that has been specifically built for Russian Aerospace Force (RuAF)'s own use, which has variants like Su-30SME (for export), and the new Su-30SM2, with upgraded avionics and more powerful Saturn AL-41F1S, that offers 3D TVC, and 20% increased thrust.
Su-27SK ("Flanker-B")
Export version of the Su-27S. The landing gear is reinforced for a maximum takeoff weight of 33 tonnes; this was a Chinese requirement to accommodate air-to-ground missions. The jamming pod is downgraded to the L203/L204. It was exported to China in the 1990s and to Indonesia in 2003. China developed the type into the Shenyang J-11.
Su-30KI
Proposed single-seat air superiority variant of the Su-27SMK with N001E radar, inflight refuelling probe and R-77 missiles. Intended for the Indonesian Air Force based on a 1997 letter of intent for 12 aircraft, and cancelled due to the 1997 Asian financial crisis.
Shenyang J-11
Chinese derivative of the Su-27SK.
Su-27UBK ("Flanker-C")
Export Su-27UB two-seater.
Su-27SKM
Single-seat multi-role fighter for export. It is a derivative of the Su-27SK but includes upgrades such as advanced cockpit, more sophisticated self-defense electronic countermeasures (ECM) and an inflight refuelling system.
Su-27UBM
Comparable upgraded Su-27UB two-seater.
Su-27SM ("Flanker-E")
Mid-life upgrade for the Russian Su-27 fleet. It includes new multi-function displays replacing analog flight instruments, improvements to the navigation system, a new fire-control system with slightly improved radar and electro-optical sighting system, and a more advanced mission computer. This allows for use of the radar in synthetic-aperture terrain mapping mode, as well as detection of maritime targets. Contrary to the basic Su-27 variants, the Su-27SM can use guided air-to-ground ordnance, including Kh-29 and Kh-31 missiles, and laser-guided bombs, as well as the R-77 air-to-air missile. The SPO-15 Beryoza is replaced by the Pastel radar warning receiver, and the Sorbtsiya wingtip jamming pods are replaced by the more modern Khibiny. 24 Su-27SMs also received slightly uprated engines.
Su-27SM2 ("Flanker-J")
Proposed 4+ gen block upgrade for Russian Su-27, featuring some technology of the Su-35BM; it includes Irbis-E radar, and uprated engines and avionics. The Su-27SM2 was never entered into service due to cost concerns.
Su-27SM3 ("Flanker-J Mod")
The Su-27SM3 is an upgrade package for existing Su-27SM fighters that modernizes its airframe and give its FCS compatibility with the more modern R-77-1 Adder BVR missile. Increased maximum takeoff weight (+3 tonnes), AL-31F-M1 engines.
Su-27UBM2
Kazakh modernized version of the Su-27UB.
Su-27M2
Kazakh modernized version of the Su-27P.
Su-27BM2
Belarusian modernized of the Su-27P for the Kazakhstan Airforce.
Su-27UB1M
Ukrainian modernized version of the Su-27UB.
Su-27S1M
Ukrainian modernized version of the Su-27S.
Su-27P1M
Ukrainian modernized version of the Su-27P.
Su-27UP1M
Ukrainian modernized version of the Su-27UP.

Su-35BM/Su-35S ("Flanker-M")
Also named the "Last Flanker", it is the latest development from the Sukhoi Flanker family. It features improved thrust vectoring AL-41F1S engines, new avionics, N035 Irbis-E radar and reduced radar cross-section.

== Operators ==
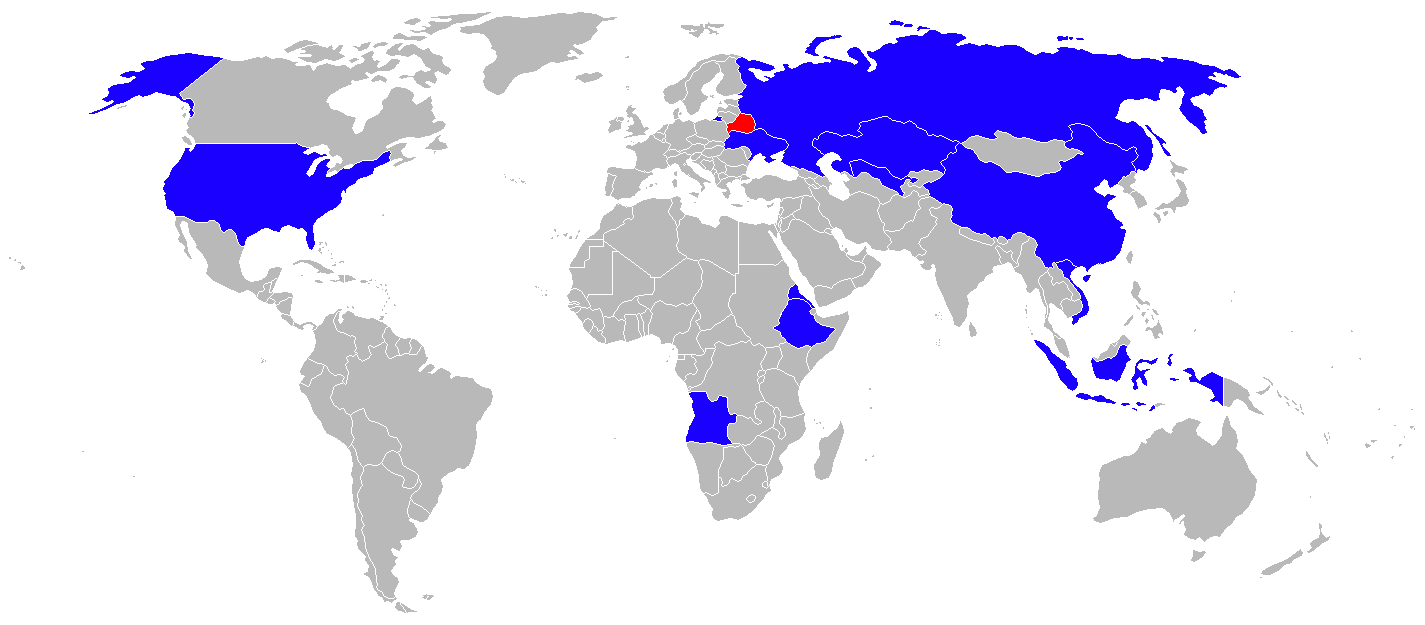
Operators of the Su-27 Current Former

=== Current ===
Angola
People's Air and Air Defence Force of Angola – 6 Su-27s in service as of February 2026. One was reportedly shot down on 19 November 2000 by a 9K34 Strela-3 MANPADS during the Angolan Civil War.
China
People's Liberation Army Air Force (PLAAF) – 78 Su-27 delivered between 1990 and 2010. 32 Su-27UBK are in service as of 2022.
Eritrea
Eritrean Air Force- Bought 2 Su-27's from Ukraine in 2002-2003.
Ethiopia
Ethiopian Air Force – up to 17 Su-27S, Su-27P, Su-27UB sourced second–hand from Russia in two different batches: 9 starting from 1998 and 8 starting from 2002. One crashed shortly after delivery on 6 January 1999; the pilot ejected and survived.
Indonesia
Indonesian Air Force – Purchased two Su-27SKs in 2003, followed by three Su-27SKMs in 2010. In 2016, Indonesia's two Su-27SKs were upgraded to Su-27SKM.

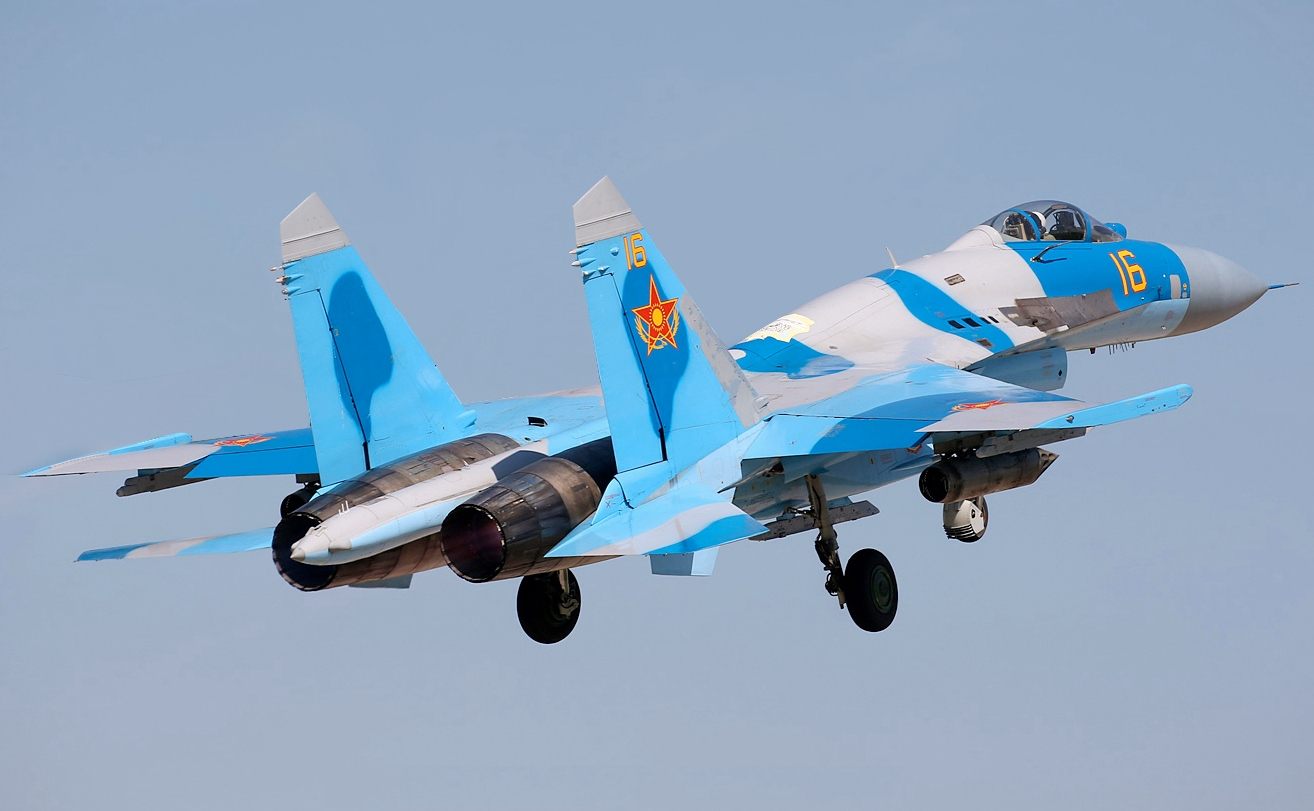
A Su-27 of the Kazakh Air Force taking off

Kazakhstan
Kazakh Air Defense Forces – Received 26 Su-27s from Russia in between 1996 and 2001.
Russia
Russian Aerospace Forces – 101 Su-27s in service as of 2021. 359 Su-27 aircraft, including 225 Su-27s, 70 Su-27SMs, 12 Su-27SM3s, and 52 Su-27UBs were in service as of January 2014. Less than 422 Su-27s are in service as of 2025 according to World Air Forces. A modernization program began in 2004. Half of the Su-27 fleet had reportedly been modernized in 2012. The Russian Aerospace Forces were receiving aircraft modernized to the SM3 standard as of 2018.
- 3rd Guards Fighter Aviation Regiment, 4th Air and Air Defence Forces Army
- 159th Guards Fighter Aviation Regiment, 6th Air and Air Defence Forces Army
As of 4 March 2025, Russia lost 2 Su-27 and one damaged on ground during Russia - Ukraine war.
Russian Navy – 53 Su-27s in use as of January 2014
Ukraine
Ukrainian Air Force – 70 Su-27s in inventory. It had 34 Su-27s in service as of March 2019.
As of 21 April 2026, Ukraine lost 19 Su-27 during the Russian invasion of Ukraine, one being grounded at the time.
United States
United States Air Force – Two Su-27Ps were delivered to the U.S. in 1995 from Belarus. Two Su-27UBs were bought from Ukraine in 2009 by a private company, Pride Aircraft for sale to civilians. The aircraft was bought by USAF in 2011 and one of them was retired in 2023. They have been spotted operating over Area 51 for evaluation and training purposes.
Uzbekistan
Uzbekistan Air and Air Defence Forces – 34 Su-27s in use as of January 2013
Vietnam
Vietnam Air Force – 5 Su-27SKs and 5 Su-27UBKs in use as of January 2013

=== Former ===
Belarus
Belarusian Air Force − Inherited 23-28 Su-27s from the former 61st Fighter Aviation Regiment of the Soviet Union. They had 22 in service as of December 2010. Nine Su-27s were sold to Angola in 1998. Belarus had operated 17 Su-27P and 4 Su-27UBM1 aircraft before their retirement in December 2012.
Soviet Union
Soviet Air Force − Passed to different successor nations in 1991.
Soviet Air Defence Forces − Over 100 Su-27s in 1988, according to US intelligence.
East Germany
East German Air Force − 35 Su-27s ordered in October 1989. None delivered before the reunification of Germany.

=== Private ownership ===
According to the U.S. FAA there are two privately owned Su-27s in the U.S., as of 2015. Two Su-27UB from the Ukrainian Air Force were demilitarised and sold to Pride Aircraft of Rockford, Illinois. Pride Aircraft modified some of the aircraft to their own desires by remarking all cockpit controls in English and replacing much of the Russian avionics suite with Garmin, Bendix/King, and Collins avionics. The aircraft were both sold to private owners for approximately $5 million each. The United States Air Force bought the aircraft in 2011 and in 2023 one of them was preserved at the National Museum of the United States Air Force.

On 30 August 2010, the Financial Times claimed that a Western private training support company ECA Program placed a US$1.5 billion order with Belarusian state arms dealer BelTechExport for 15 unarmed Su-27s (with an option on 18 more) to organize a dissimilar air combat training school in the former NATO airbase in Keflavik, Iceland, with deliveries due by the end of 2012. A September 2010 media report by RIA Novosti, the state-owned news agency, questioned the existence of the agreement. No further developments on such a plan have been reported by 2014, while a plan for upgrading and putting the retired Belarusian Air Force Su-27 fleet back to service was reported in February 2014.

== Notable accidents ==
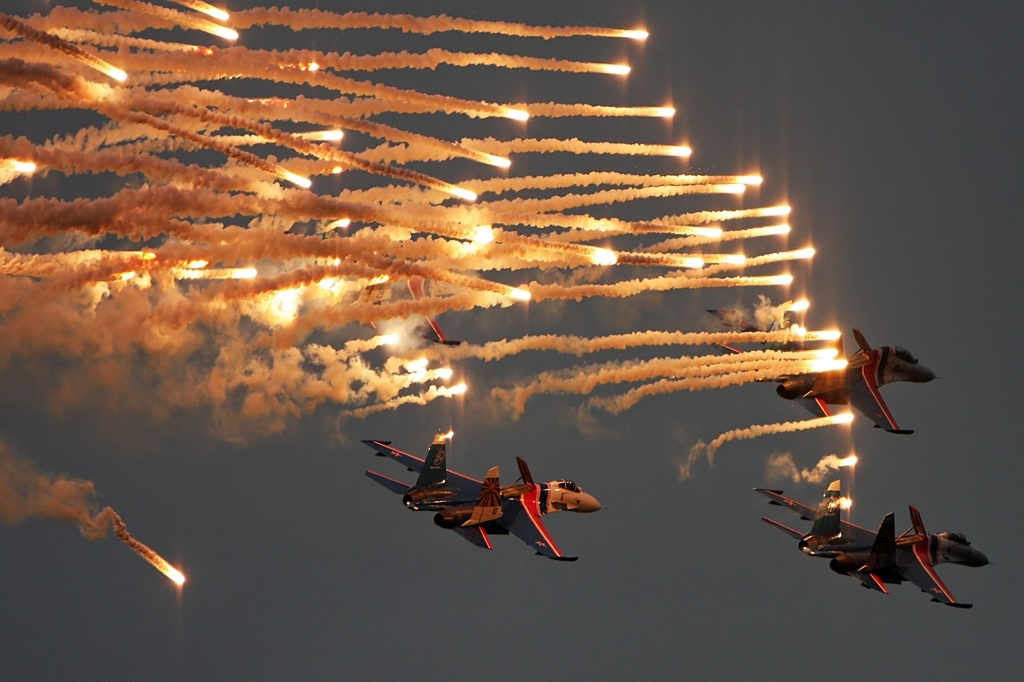
Russian Knights paying tribute to Igor Tkachenko, leader of the group who died during practice a week earlier

- 9 September 1990: A Soviet Su-27 crashed at the Salgareda airshow in 1990 after pulling a loop at too low an altitude. The Lithuanian pilot, Rimantas Stankevičius, and a spectator were killed.
- 12 December 1995: Two Su-27s and an Su-27UB of the Russian Knights flight demonstration team crashed into terrain outside of Cam Ranh, Vietnam, killing four team pilots. Six Su-27s and an Ilyushin Il-76 support aircraft were returning from Langkawi International Maritime and Aerospace Exhibition. The aircraft were flying in echelons right and left of the Il-76 on their way to Cam Ranh for refueling. During the landing approach, the Il-76 passed too close to the terrain and the three right-echelon Su-27s crashed. The other aircraft landed safely at Cam Ranh. The cause was controlled flight into terrain; contributing factors were pilot error, mountainous terrain and poor weather.
- 27 July 2002: A Ukrainian Su-27 crashed while performing an aerobatics presentation, killing 77 spectators in what is now considered the deadliest air show disaster in history. Both pilots ejected and suffered only minor injuries.
- 16 August 2009: While practicing for the 2009 MAKS Airshow, two Su-27s of the Russian Knights collided in mid-air above Zhukovsky Airfield, south-east of Moscow, killing the Knights' leader, Igor Tkachenko. One of the jets crashed into a house and started a fire. A probe into the crash was launched; according to the Russian Defense Ministry the accident may have been caused by a "flying skill error".
- 30 August 2009: A Belarusian Su-27UBM (Number black 63) crashed while performing at the Radom Air Show.
- 14 March 2023: A Russian Su-27 flew near a USAF MQ-9 UAV operating in international airspace over the Black Sea, dumped fuel on it (presumably to try to set it alight), and finally collided with the propeller which caused the USAF operator to ditch the UAV into the sea.

== Aircraft on display ==
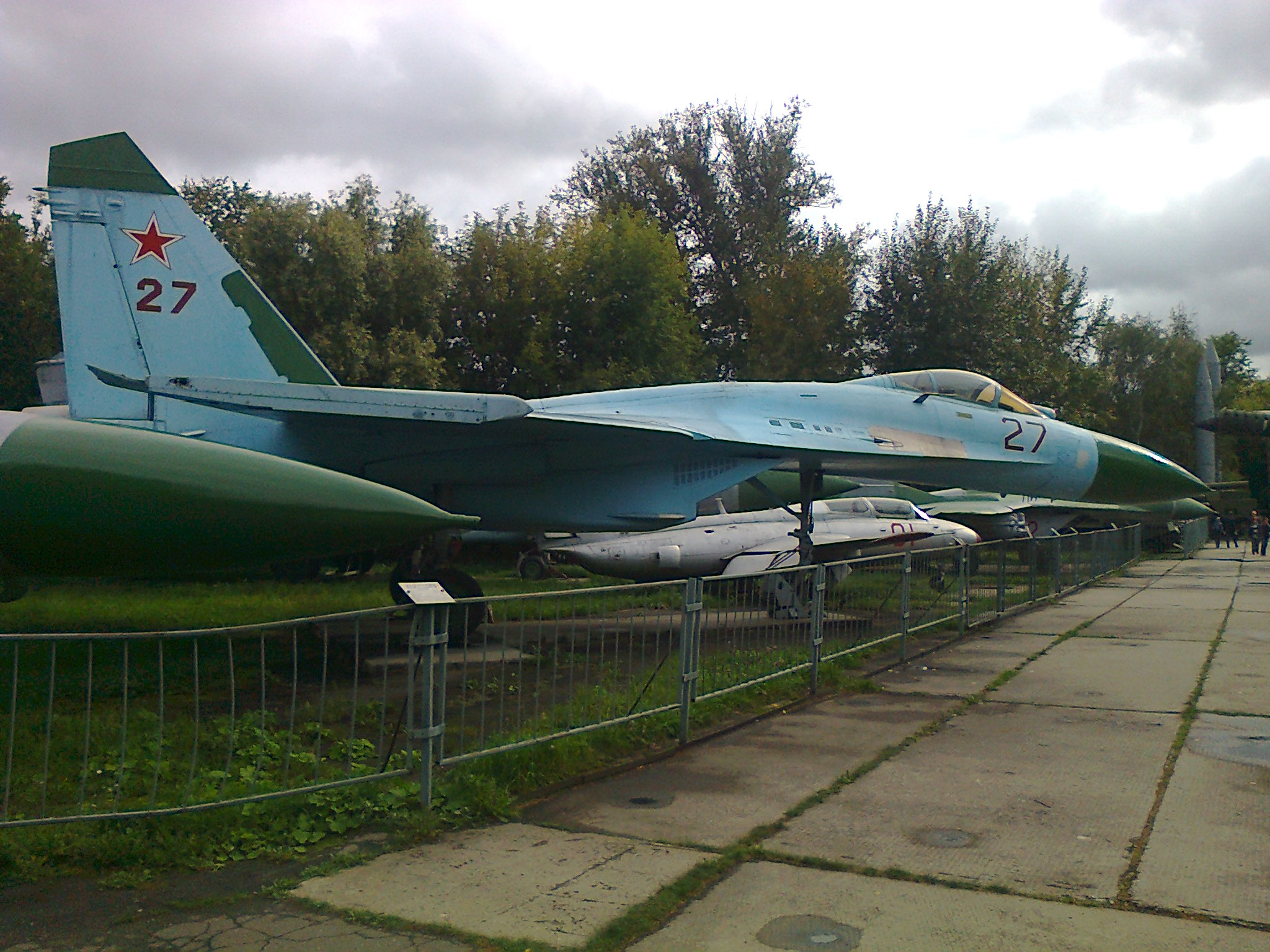
Su-27PD at the Central Armed Forces Museum in Moscow

- Sukhoi T-10-1 prototype on static display at the Central Air Force Museum in Moscow
- 36911004002 – T-10-10 prototype on display at the Aviation Technical Museum in Luhansk, Ukraine
- 36911005705 – T-10-20 prototype on display at the Technical Museum of Vadim Zadorozhny in Krasnogorsky District, Moscow Oblast
- 36911016202 – Su-27M on static display at the Central Air Force Museum in Moscow
- 36911027311 – Su-27 on static display at the Exhibition of Achievements of National Economy in Moscow
- 36911028719 – Su-27 on static display at the Central Air Force Museum in Moscow
- 36911027514 – Su-27 on static display at the Patriot Park in Kubinka
- 36911031003 – Su-27PD on static display at the Central Armed Forces Museum in Moscow
- 36911034205 – Su-27 on static display at the Patriot Park (Vatanparvarlar bogʻi) in Qarshi, Uzbekistan
- 36911034512 – Su-27P on display at the Victory Park in Hlybokaye, Belarus
- 96310408027 – Su-27UB on static display at the National Museum of the United States Air Force in Dayton, Ohio
- 96310422069 – Su-27UB on static display at the Patriot Park in Kubinka

== Specifications (Su-27SK) ==
Sukhoi Su-27 3-view drawings

Data from Sukhoi, KnAAPO, Deagel.com, Airforce-Technology.com

General characteristics

- Crew: 1
- Length: 21.9 m (71 ft 10 in)
- Wingspan: 14.7 m (48 ft 3 in)
- Height: 5.92 m (19 ft 5 in)
- Wing area: 62 m^{2} (670 sq ft)
- Empty weight: 16,380 kg (36,112 lb)
- Gross weight: 23,430 kg (51,654 lb)
- Max takeoff weight: 33,000 kg (72,753 lb)
- Fuel capacity: 9,400 kg (20,723.5 lb) internal
- Powerplant: 2 × Saturn AL-31F afterburning turbofan engines, 75.22 kN (16,910 lbf) thrust each dry, 122.6 kN (27,600 lbf) with afterburner

Performance

- Maximum speed: 2,500 km/h (1,553 mph, 1,350 kn) at altitude
- Maximum speed: Mach 2.35
  - 1,400 km/h (870 mph; 760 kn) / M1.13 at sea level
- Range: 3,530 km (2,190 mi, 1,910 nmi) at cruising altitude carrying rockets 2xR-27R1, 2xR-73E launched at half distance
  - 1,340 km (830 mi; 720 nmi) at sea level
- Service ceiling: 18,500 m (60,700 ft) without external ordnance and stores
  - 17,750 m (with some load)
- g limits: +9
- Rate of climb: 300 m/s (59,000 ft/min)
- Wing loading: 377.9 kg/m^{2} (77.4 lb/sq ft) With 56% fuel
  - 444.61 kg/m^{2} (91.1 lb/sq ft)
- Thrust/weight: 1.07 with 56% internal fuel; 0.91 with full fuel

Armament

- Guns: 1 × 30 mm Gryazev-Shipunov GSh-30-1 autocannon with 150 rounds
- Hardpoints: 10 external pylons with a capacity of up to 4,430 kg (9,770 lb), with provisions to carry combinations of:
  - Rockets:
    - S-8KOM/BM/OM
    - S-13T/OF
    - S-25OFM-PU
  - Missiles:
    - 6 × R-27R/ER/T/ET/P/EP air-to-air missiles (AAMs)
    - 6 × R-73E AAMs
    - 6 × R-77 BVRAAMs
  - Bombs:
    - FAB-500 general purpose bomb
    - FAB-250 general purpose bomb
    - KMGU munitions dispenser
    - BETAB-500 concrete piercing bomb
    - SAB-100 illumination/training bomb
    - RBK-250 cluster bomb
    - RBK-500 cluster bomb

Avionics

- N001E radar
- Phazotron Zhuk-MSE radar
- Phazotron Zhuk-MSFE radar
- OEPS-27 electro-optical targeting system
- SPO-15 Radar Warning Receiver
- OLS-27 IRST and laser rangefinder
- Shchel-3UM helmet-mounted display system

== See also ==
Related development

- Sukhoi Su-30
- Sukhoi Su-33
- Sukhoi Su-34
- Sukhoi Su-35
- Sukhoi Su-37
- Shenyang J-11
- Shenyang J-15
- Shenyang J-16

Aircraft of comparable role, configuration, and era

- McDonnell Douglas F-15 Eagle

Related lists

- List of fighter aircraft
