= Swifts (aerobatic team) =

Russian air force aerobatic team

Strizhi (Swifts) 237 TsPAT (237th Centre for Display of Aviation Equipment)
- Swifts aerobatic team logo
- Active: 6 May 1991 – present
- Country: Russian Federation
- Branch: Russian Air Force
- Role: Aerobatic display team
- Garrison/HQ: Kubinka Air Base; Moscow Oblast, Russia
- Colors: White, Red, Dark Blue

Aircraft flown
- Fighter: 6 MiG-29

The Swifts (Russian: Стрижи, romanized: Strizhi) is an aerobatic demonstrator team of the Russian Air Force, formed on 6 May 1991. The team currently performs with 6 MiG-29/29UB aircraft.

== Team roster ==
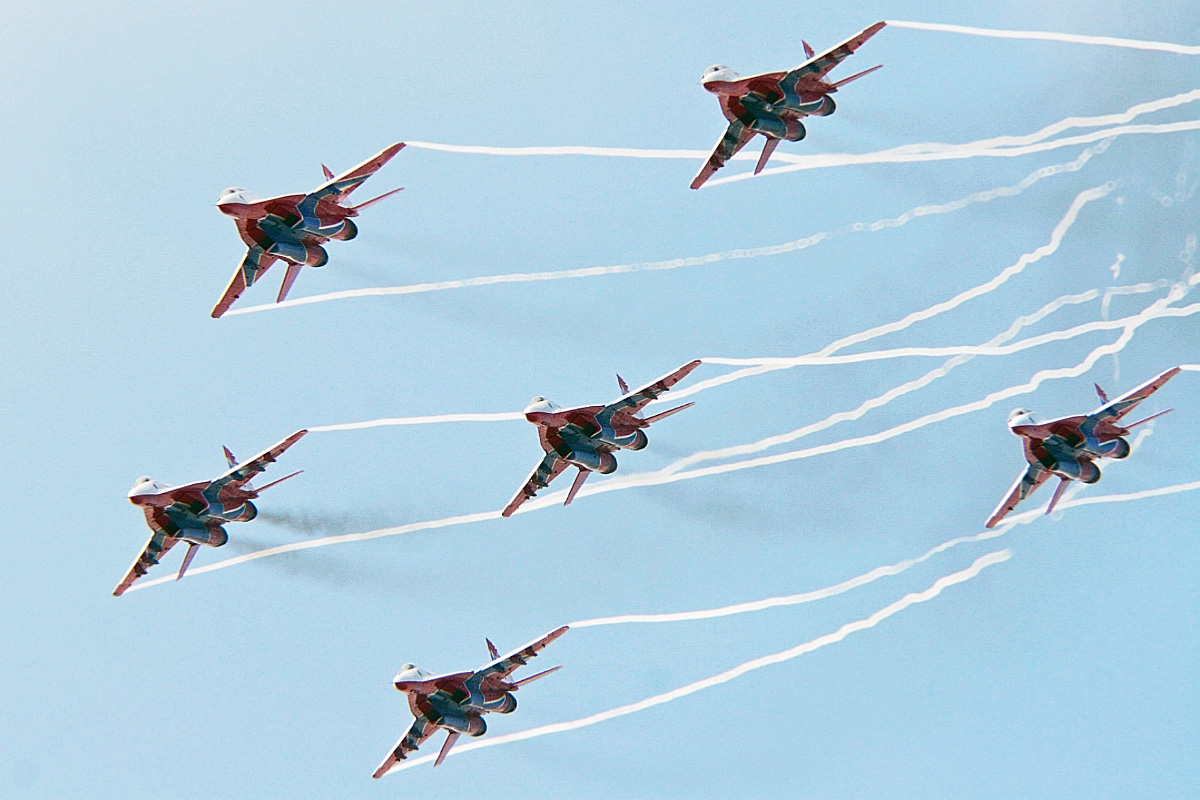
Swifts at MAKS Air Show in 2007

The team roster today unchanged since 2008. According to the Russian conventions surnames are listed first, followed by first name and patronymic:

- Selutin, Viktor Markovich, Guards colonel, “Strizhi” aerobatic team commander. Tail wingman, team leader
- Morozov, Valeriy Anatolyevich, Guards lieutenant colonel, “Strizhi” aerobatic team master pilot. Team leader
- Sokolov, Igor Evgenevich, Guards lieutenant colonel, aerobatic team deputy commander. Left wingman
- Osyaikin, Sergey Ivanovich, Guards lieutenant colonel, “Strizhi” aerobatic team master pilot. Right wingman
- Koposov, Dmitriy Alexandrovich, Guards lieutenant colonel, aerobatic team deputy commander. Right wingman, single aerobatic, extreme flying
- Prohorov, Aleksey Vladimirovich, Guards lieutenant colonel, “Strizhi” aerobatic team master pilot, left wingman
- Vasiliev, Sergey Alekseevich, Guards lieutenant colonel, “Strizhi” aerobatic team master pilot
- Kuznetsov, Denis, Captain, “Strizhi” aerobatic team pilot

== See also ==
- Soviet air shows
- MAKS Air Show
- Russian Knights
