= Russian Knights =

Russian Air Force aerobatics team

- Russian Knights insignia
- Active: 5 April 1991 – present
- Country: Russia
- Branch: Russian Air Force
- Garrison/HQ: Kubinka (air base); Moscow Oblast, Russia
- Colors: Red, White and Blue

Aircraft flown
- Fighter: 8 Su-30SM; 8 Su-35S

The Russian Knights (Russian: Русские Витязи, romanized: Russkie Vityazi) is an aerobatic demonstration team of the Russian Air Force. Originally formed on April 5, 1991, at the Kubinka Air Base as a team of six Sukhoi Su-27s, the team was the first to perform outside the Soviet Union in September 1991.

The team has performed with eight Su-30SM fighters since October 2016, and added eight Su-35S in November 2019, bringing its total aircraft to sixteen.

== History ==
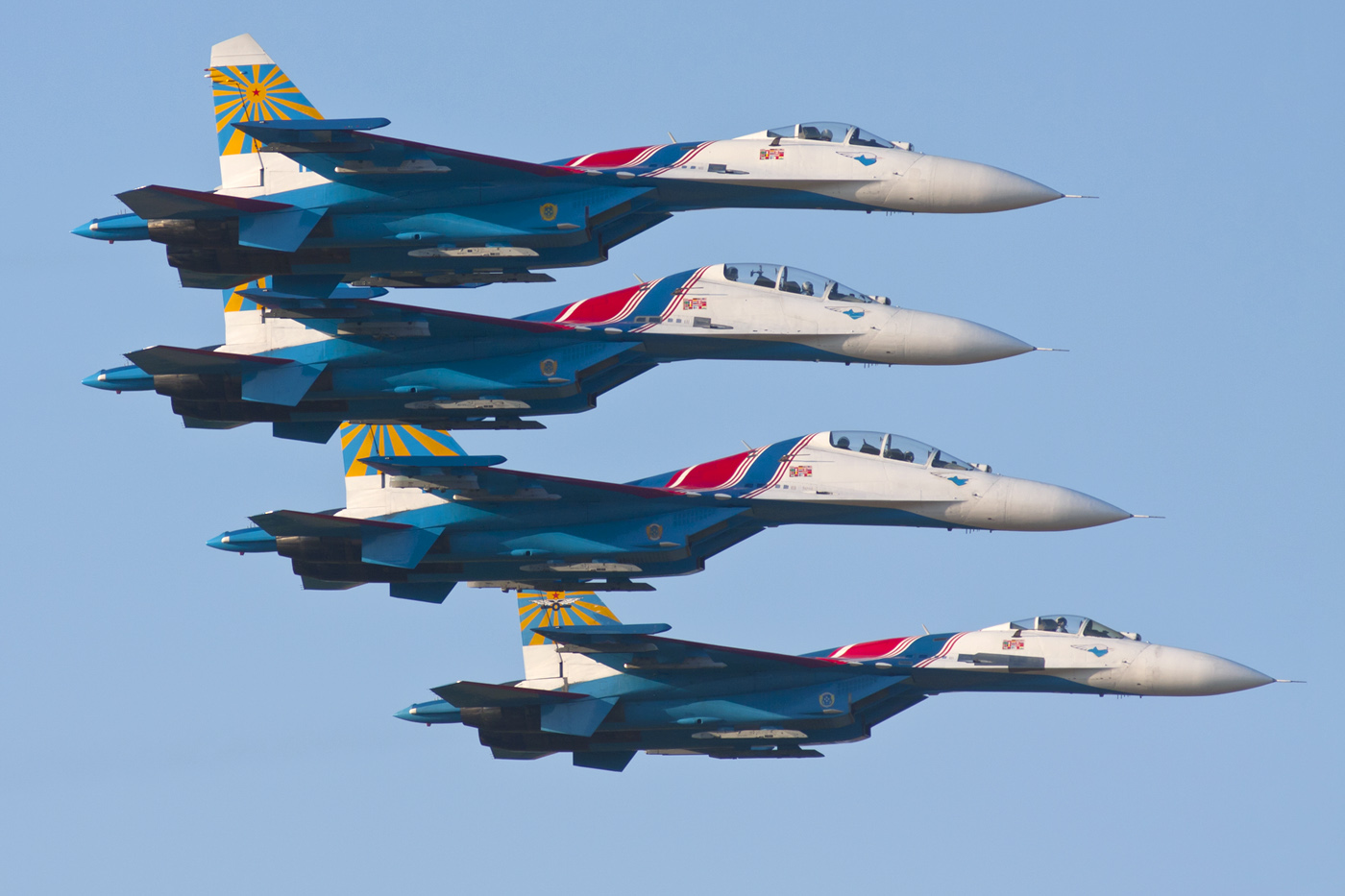
Russian Knights Su-27 fighters over the Kecskemet airshow in Hungary, 2013

The team continues to operate out of Kubinka, a major airfield of the Russian Air Force in the Moscow region.

Formed in 1991 with 6 Su-27 fighter jets, the team now operates 16 Sukhoi jets in total - 8 Su-30SM (Flanker-H) and 8 Su-35S (Flanker-E).

Due to increased demand placed on the Russian Air Force during the Russo-Ukrainian war, pilots and even fighter jets of the Russian Knights have been assigned active combat duties, such as escort missions.

== Accident and incidents ==
On 12 December 1995, when approaching the Cam Ranh airfield (Vietnam) in adverse weather for refueling, two Su-27s and an Su-27UB of the Russian Knights team flew into a nearby mountain while in-formation, killing four pilots. The cause of the crash is attributed to a misinterpretation of approach-pattern instructions, and in particular the leading Il-76 that was acting as a reconnaissance aircraft.

On 16 August 2009, two Su-27s rehearsing acrobatic maneuvers collided near Moscow, killing one pilot and sending the jets crashing into nearby vacation homes. The dead pilot was the Russian Knights' commander, Guards Colonel Igor Tkachenko, a decorated air force officer.

On 9 June 2016, a Su-27 pilot was killed near Moscow as he failed to eject when trying to avoid homes.

On 24 May 2024, Ukrainian drones struck the Kushchevskaya Air Base, hitting multiple fighter aircraft. Satellite imagery later revealed that one of the damaged fighters was painted with the distinctive livery of the Russian Knights. The fighter was a single seater airframe, identified as either an Su-27P or an Su-35S as the two are indistinguishable on satellite images.

On 21 October 2026, a Su-30SM crashed in the Moscow Region, although it was initially an unconfirmed report released by Russian milbloggers. Later the deaths of two Russian Knights aerobatic team pilots, Colonel Oleg Erofeev and Lieutenant Colonel Vladimir Kochetov, were announced by official Russian sources, indicating that the aircraft was likely one of the team's air display jets.

== See also ==
- Soviet air shows
- MAKS Air Show
- Swifts
