= Igor Tkachenko =

Russian military pilot (1964-2009)

- Born: 26 July 1964; Ventsy, Krasnodar Krai, Soviet Union
- Died: 16 August 2009 (aged 45) Moscow Oblast, Russia
- Allegiance: Soviet Union; Russian Federation
- Branch: Soviet Air Force; Russian Air Force
- Service years: 1980's - 2009
- Rank: Guard Colonel
- Awards: Hero of the Russian Federation

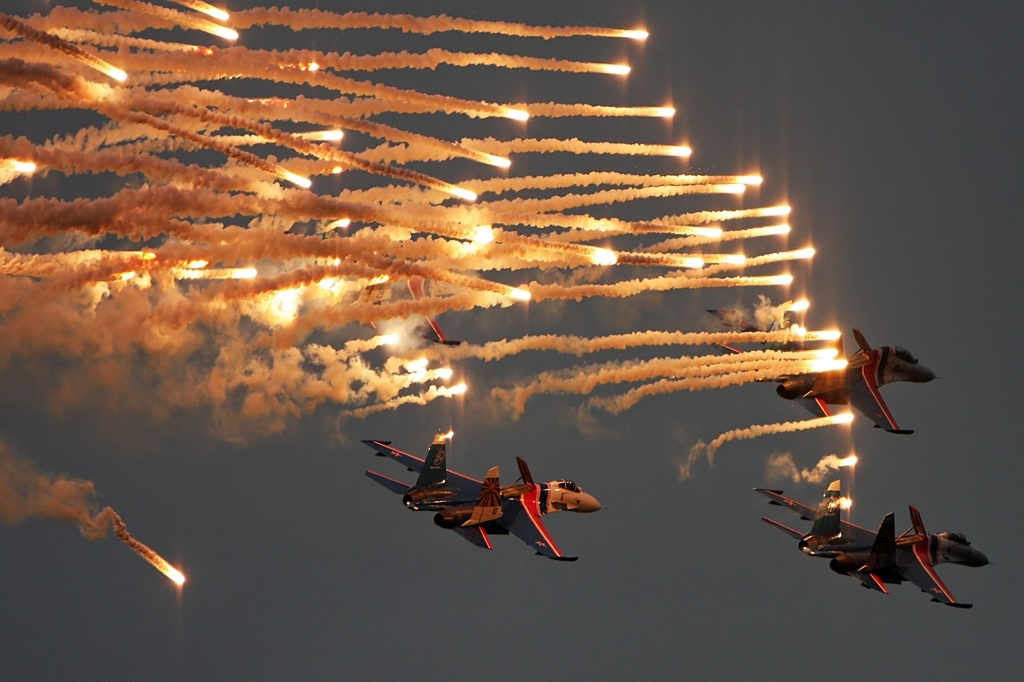
Russian Knights salute in memory of Igor Tkachenko, leader of the group, who died during practice a week earlier.

Igor Valentinovich Tkachenko (Russian: И́горь Валенти́нович Ткаче́нко, July 26, 1964 — August 16, 2009) was a Russian military pilot with the rank of Colonel, Russian Knights group leader, Chief of the 237th Guards Aviation Showing Center of the Russian Air Force at Kubinka air base. He was killed in a mid-air collision whilst practicing for the 2009 MAKS Airshow.

He was awarded the Hero of the Russian Federation honorary title posthumously on August 22, 2009, and the main-belt asteroid 269390 Igortkachenko, discovered by Russian amateur astronomer Leonid Elenin in 2009, was named in his memory. Naming citation was published on 19 September 2013 (M.P.C. 85018).

== Commands ==
- Commander of the 237-th Aviation Technology Demonstration Center of the Russian Federation's AF
- Commander of the Russian Knights

== See also ==
- List of Heroes of the Russian Federation
