= MAKS (air show) =

Russian annual international airshow

International Aviation and Space Show (MAKS)
- MAKS logo 2021
- Status: Active
- Genre: Air show
- Dates: July
- Frequency: Biennial: Odd years
- Venue: Zhukovsky International Airport
- Location: Moscow
- Coordinates: 55°33′30″N 38°08′47″E
- Country: Russia
- Established: 1992; 34 years ago
- Most recent: 20–25 July 2021
- Next event: 2027
- Attendance: c. 452,300 (2017)
- Website: aviasalon.com/eng

MAKS (Russian: МАКС, short for: Международный авиационно-космический салон, romanized: Mezhdunarodnyj aviatsionno-kosmicheskij salon, lit. '"International Aviation and Space Show"') is an international air show held at Zhukovsky International Airport, the home of the Gromov Flight Research Institute in Zhukovsky, 40 km (25 mi) southeast of Moscow, Russia. The event was organized by the Russian Ministry of Industry and Trade until 2009, more recently by the Government of Moscow and Aviasalon. The first show, Mosaeroshow-92, was held in 1992. Since 1993, the air show was renamed as MAKS and is held biennially on odd years.

MAKS is an important event for the Russian aviation industry and the Commonwealth of Independent States. Although it started mainly as an entertainment event, the show soon became a marketplace where Russian aerospace companies could negotiate export contracts and Russian air carriers could make foreign contacts.

The event was scheduled for July 25–30, 2023, but was postponed to 2024, allegedly because of security concerns. In June 2024, the Russian government announced that it would be further postponed to 2025. In July 2024, the show's organisers announced that an online version would be held instead. A show was going to be held in July–August 2026, but that was cancelled, and the next show is scheduled for 2027.

== Background and history ==
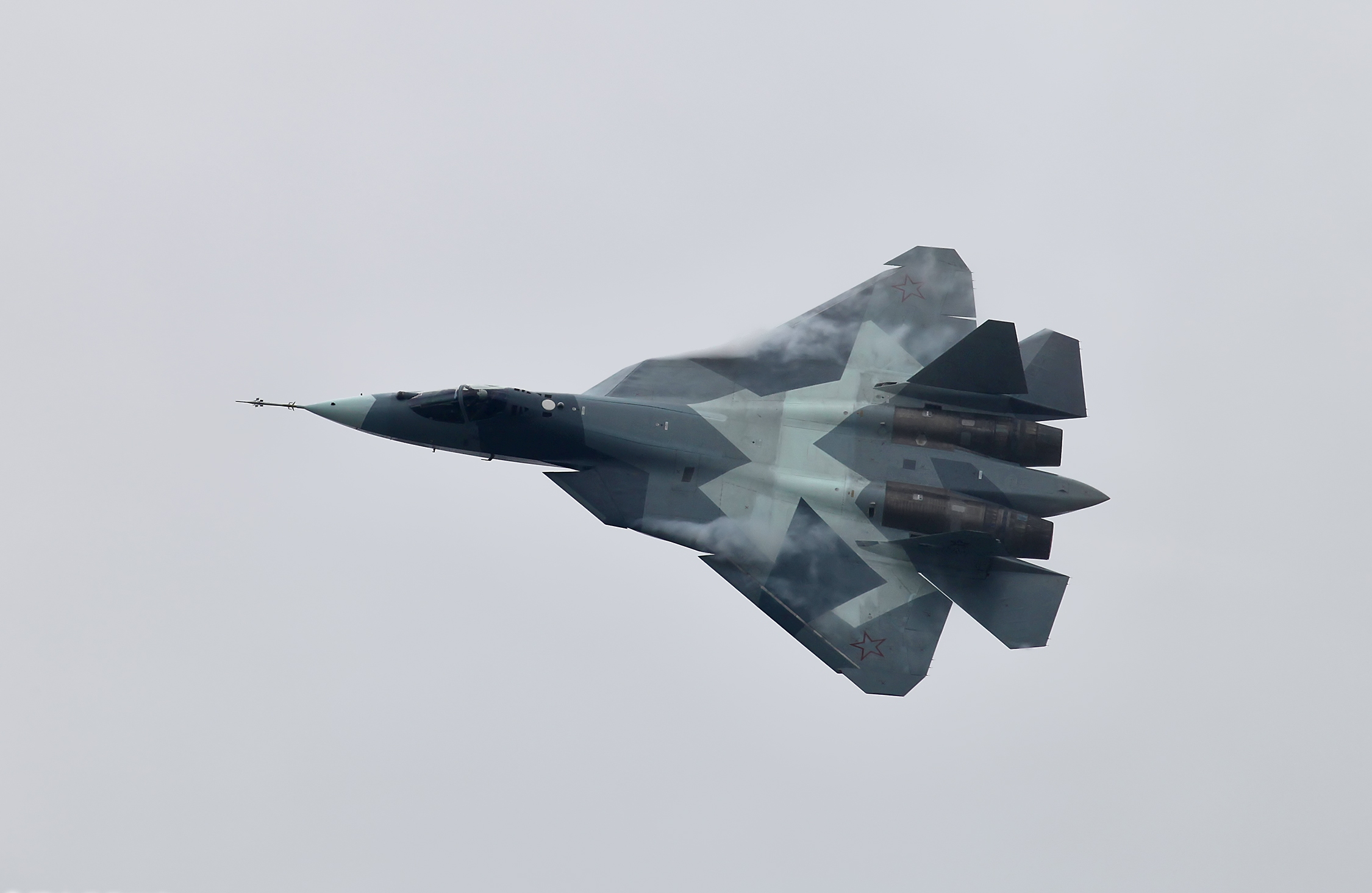
Sukhoi Su-57 prototype at MAKS-2013

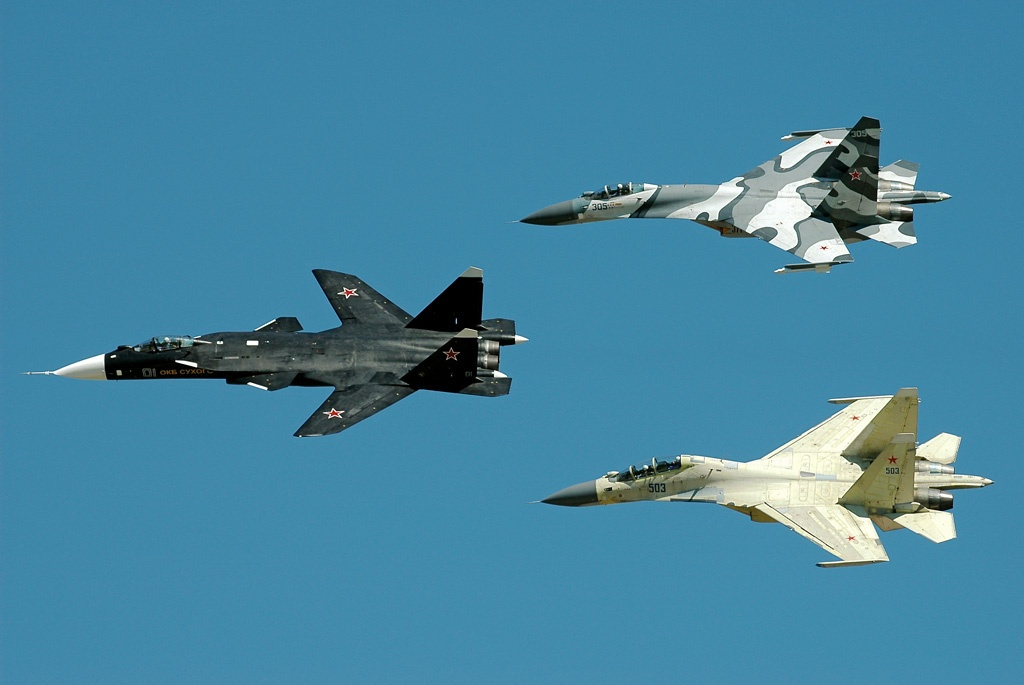
Sukhoi Su-47 Berkut flying in formation at MAKS-2005

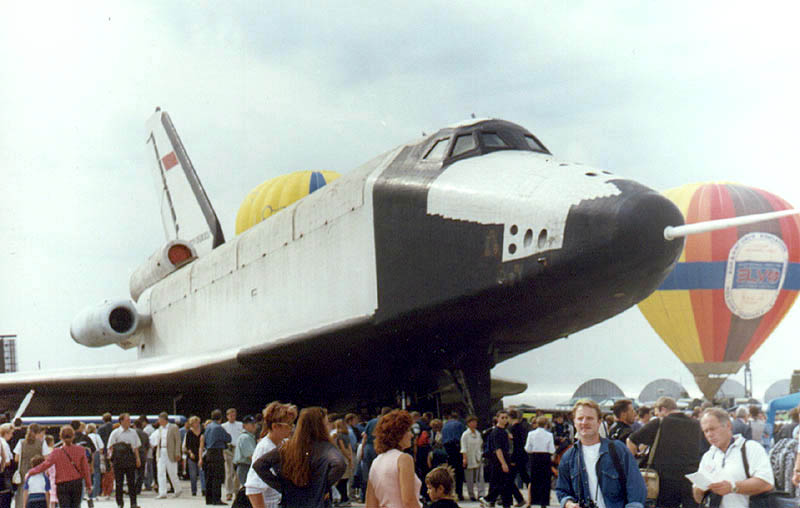
Buran aerodynamic analogue BST-02 OK-GLI at MAKS-1999

The air show's history traces back to 1911, when one was held in Mikhailovskiy Square in Saint Petersburg. The Soviet Union held annual air shows on the Tushino Airfield in Moscow 22 years later. Its history in Zhukovskiy, however, began much later with the Engineering Show by TsAGI in 1990.

The objective of the MAKS air show is to demonstrate leading technologies and to open up the Russian aerospace industry to the international market. A large portion of the show is dedicated to holding scientific conferences and symposia, under the auspices of Russia's Central Aerohydrodynamic Institute.

The air show is held in the city of Zhukovsky, at Zhukovsky International Airport, which is the home of the Gromov Flight Research Institute. After the dissolution of the Soviet Union, many aviation companies eventually moved to Zhukovsky, using the Gromov Flight Research Institute's airfield for MosAeroShow-92 held on 11–16 August 1992. A second show was held in 1993, now renamed MAKS. Since then the air show has been held biannually. It lasts for six days, three of which are open to the general public.

Most of previous MAKS air shows were systematic: it usually opens with the attendance of the President of Russia, followed by company talks, and concludes with aircraft demonstrations by aerobatic teams such as the Russian Knights, Swifts, and foreign teams like Patrouille de France or Frecce Tricolori.

Some highlights include:

- The first public unveiling of the forward-swept-wing S-37 (later Su-47) Berkut at MAKS-1999.
- The handling of the corporate programs overall cost reductions scandal which made EADS (later Airbus) refuse to attend the same airshow, damaging the image of the airshow substantially.
- The first inclusion of American aircraft at MAKS-2003.
- The leasing of Plesetsk cosmodrome for launching 5 German SAR-Lupe satellites at MAKS-2003, the first aerospace contract signed throughout the MAKS history.
- The unveiling of the Kliper spacecraft at MAKS-2005.
- The tribute flight of 4 Su-27s from the Russian Knights to pay tribute to the team's commander, Igor Tkachenko at MAKS-2009, who died in his aircraft after a collision with another Su-27 during a flight training 2 days prior to the opening of the airshow.
- The unveiling of Sukhoi Su-57 prototype at MAKS-2011.
- The first inclusion of other foreign aerobatic teams such as the August 1st from China and the Baltic Bees from Latvia at MAKS-2013.
- The unveiling of a prototype of a fifth-generation lightweight, single-engine, stealth fighter jet Sukhoi Su-75 Checkmate at the MAKS-2021.

== Other facts ==
- The educational "MAKSyata" club for teenagers was established in 2001, bringing children born in Zhukovskiy in the days of the air show.
- At MAKS-2009, employees from the Moscow department of the Federal Bailiff Service(FSSP) of the Russian Federation, in coordination with the staff of the Internal Affairs Directorate carried out a raid on debtors hiding among the visitors of the airshow. Bailiffs stationed near the Vereya village of the Ramenskoye village and intercepted debtors, with a poster that read: "Debtor, do you want to experience the feeling of flying?! Pay your debts and fly!". A total of more than 12 million rubles was recovered from debtors.

== Accidents ==
- The prototype Beriev Be-103 amphibious aircraft crashed on the day before the opening of MAKS-1997. After takeoff at 11:14 local time, at an altitude of about 100 meters, the pilot attempted to stay in his designated flight zone by a steep turn, which unintentionally set the aircraft into a steep climb, causing a stall at a supercritical angle of attack without adequate altitude to recover. The pilot was killed.
- On August 16, 2009, while preparing for the MAKS-2009, two Sukhoi Su-27s of the Russian Knights aerobatic team crashed into each other, killing the commander of the team and injuring several people on the ground. The death of the pilot was paid tribute to by a minute of silence at the opening of the airshow.
