= Valentin Matyashev =

Valentin Vasilievitch Matyashev (October 8, 1927 – January 6, 2008) was a General Director of the Research Institute of Instrument Design (NIIP) from 1978 to 1998. A professor, Laureate of the Lenin and State awards and academician of the International Academy of Informatization.

Under the leadership of Matyashev, second and third generations of Buk SAM system were created in NIIP.

One of the most significant developments under his direction became the weapons control system "Zaslon" for MiG-31 interceptor and "Myech" (Sword) for the multirole fighter Su-27.

He is an honorary citizen of Zhukovsky.

== Sources ==
- Valentin Matyashev, Buk-M1 air defense missile system engages ships. Military Parade'97. 5. p. 28
- Russian radar fights to sharpen image, Jane's Defence Weekly, Dec 18, 1996
- JPRS Report Central Eurasia Military Affairs Defense Industry and Conversion (ADA333126), Defense Technical Information Center, 30 June 1993
