= Bars radar =

Russian radars

Bars
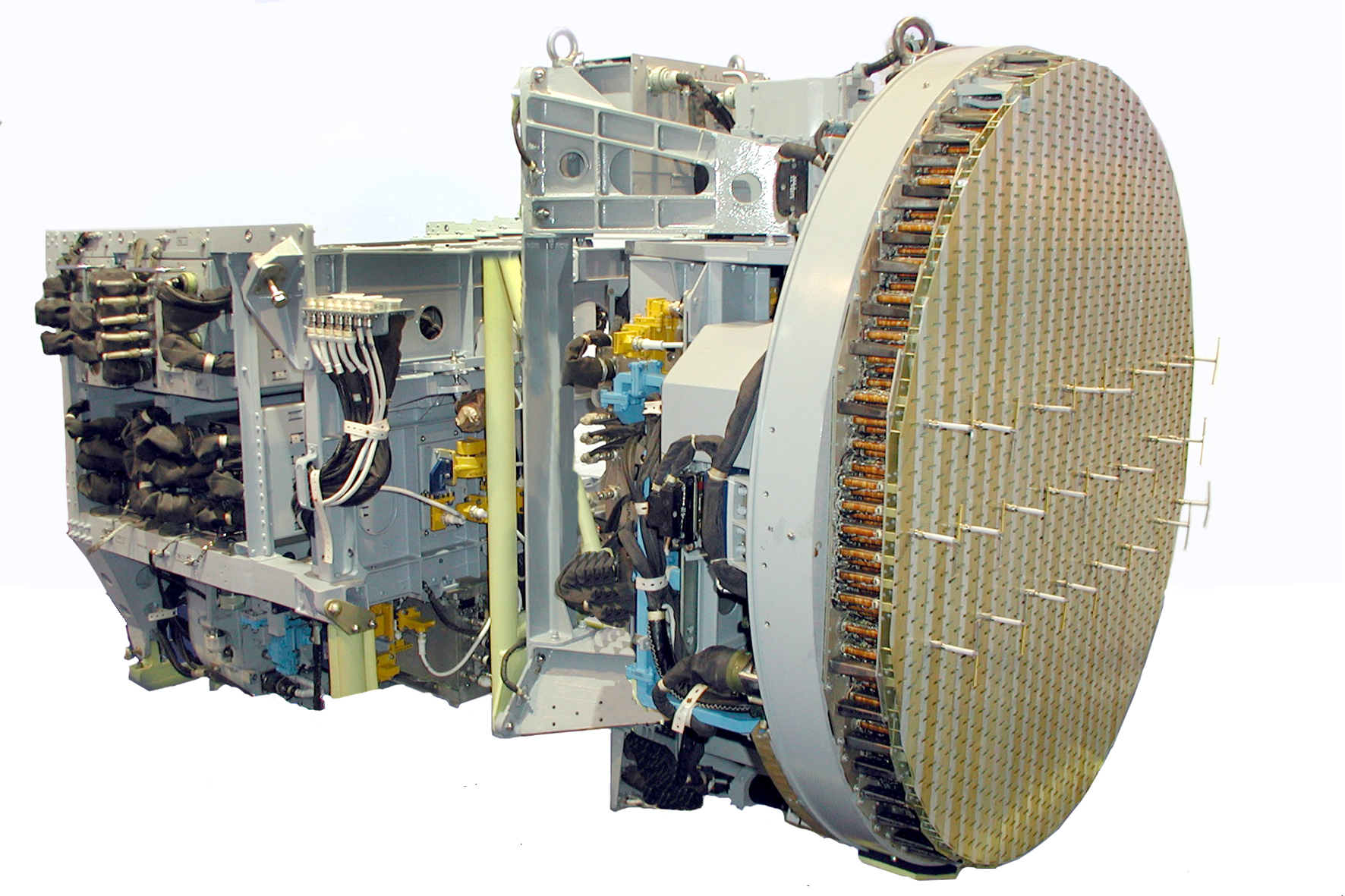
- Country of origin: Russia
- Type: Slotted Planar array/PESA
- Frequency: X band

The N011 Bars (Russian: Барс, lit. 'Leopard') is a family of Russian (former USSR) all-weather multimode airborne radars developed by the Tikhomirov Scientific Research Institute of Instrument Design for multi-role combat aircraft such as the Su-27, Su-30 and the MiG-29.

== N011 ==
The first Bars series radar was the N011, which was originally an X band Pulse-Doppler radar developed for the Su-27. In this original N011 form, it deployed a mechanically scanned planar array with 960 mm diameter, ±85 degrees scan sector. The peak output power reached 8 kW with an average of 2 kW. The N011 features a low noise UHF input amplifier, and fully digitized signal processing unit using reprogrammable digital computers.

The original requirement to simultaneously track 20 targets and engage 8 of the 20 tracked proved impossible to achieve at the time due to the available Soviet technology, but the N011 is still able to simultaneously track 13 targets and engage 4. This was subsequently upgraded to tracking 15 targets and engaging 6 of the 15 tracked. The maximum air-to-air detection range is over 400 km when used in an airborne early warning role, and when used for intercepting role, the range against a typical fighter sized target is 140 km head-on, and 65 km tail-on.

For air-to-surface mode, the N011 has five air-to-ground modes and four maritime modes, including ground mapping, terrain-following radar and terrain-avoidance modes. The maximum air-to-surface mode is over 200 km against an aircraft carrier type of target.

== N011M ==
The second member of the Bars radar family is the N011M, a radar that uses an electronically scanned (phased array) slotted planar antenna but with the experience gained from the development of the N007 Zaslon. In an effort to improve performance the antenna design was changed to a multi-channel passive electronically scanned array (PESA). The design of the N011M Bars antenna like the earlier N007 antenna consists of two separate electronically controlled arrays, an X band radar and an L band IFF transponder with a total weight of 100 kg and a diameter of 960 mm. The radar has a peak power output of 4-5 kW and is capable of positioning beams in 400 microseconds, a huge advantage over mechanically scanned radar. The Bars radar can be fixed in position to give a scanning sector of ±70 degrees in azimuth and ±45 degrees in elevation. To improve scan coverage, the radar can also be mounted on electromechanical drives, and in this case, the scanning sector is expanded to ±90 degrees.

The 28 MHz Ts200 programmable signal processor used in N011M incorporates Fourier transforms of "butterfly" type capable of 75 Million operations per second. The N011M supports digital signal processing using 3 processors with 16 MB of both static and flash memory. The peak output is 4 to 5 kW with an average output of 1.2 kW, and the total radar system weighs around 650 kg. N011M is used on Su-30SM, Su-30MKI, Su-30MKM, and the contract for the N011M radar has three stages. The initial MK1 software was tested in 2002 and supplied with the first Su-30MKI deliveries. India was supposed to build both programmable signal processors and data processors under project "Vetrivale" to replace the original Russian components, but failed to do so within the required time frame, so MK2 still used the Russian equipment. In 2004, India delivered Vetrivale radar computer based in the i960 architecture. It's worth noting that N011M is not simply a PESA, but instead, it's a transition between PESA and AESA in that it adopts technologies from both: each transceiver on the antenna array of N011M has its own receiver amplifier, which is the same as AESA, and with noise level of 3 dB, which is also in the same class of AESA arrays. However, for transmitting, N011M uses PESA technology in that a single Chelnok traveling-wave tube is used for EGSP-6A transmitter. There are three receiving channels for N011M.

N011M has a search range of 400 km and a tracking range of 200 km, with 60 km in the rear in the air-to-air mode. Detection range fighter type MIG-29 in area of review of over 300 sq. deg: - on towards course - up to 140 km; - in pursuit of - up to 60 km. Up to 15 air targets can be tracked at once in track while scan mode with 4 of these engaged at once. The N011M can use a number of short range and speed search modes and is capable of identifying the type and number of multiple targets. The Bars radar is compatible with R-77 and R-27 radar guided missiles providing both illumination and data-link guidance as well as the R-73 IR guided missile.

In the air-to-surface mode the radar is capable of detecting ground and naval based moving targets, determining their location and maintaining a track on two surface targets at once. The N011 is capable of detecting the group of tanks target to a maximum range of 40–50 km and a destroyer sized target to a range of 80–120 km. Bars also features a mapping mode using either real beam, doppler beam sharpening or Synthetic aperture radar with a maximum resolution of 10 meters. The Kh-31 anti-radiation missile is also compatible with the radar.

== N035 ==
N035 Irbis-E (Russian: Снежный барс, lit. 'Snow Leopard') radar is the most powerful radar of Bars radar family, and it is a direct descendant of N011M, and it adopts many components of N011M to save cost and shorten the developmental time. The difference between N035 and its predecessor N011M is that the receiving channel is increased to 4 in N035 from the original 3 in N011M. A new transmitter EGSP-27 incorporated an upgraded version of Chelnok traveling wave tube that is capable of delivering 10 kW peak power output, resulting in the peak output of N035 increased to 20 kW, with an average output peak of 5 kW and continuous wave illumination of 2 kW. A new 5010–35.01 digital processor and a new 5010–35.02 info processor are used, and N035 has twice the bandwidth of N011M. The noise level is increased to 3.5 dB from the 3 dB of N011M, and against typical aerial target with 3 square meters, the effective range is in excess of 400 km (head-on). Against stealth target with 0.01 square meters, the head-on effective range is in excess of 90 km. N035 radar can simultaneously track 30 targets and engage 2 of the 30 with semi-active radar homing air-to-air missiles, and when using active radar homing missiles, the number of targets it can simultaneously engage is increased to 8.

== Bars-29 ==
The Tikhomirov Scientific Research Institute of Instrument Design has displayed a modified N011M radar for the MiG-29 designated the Bars-29. The Bars-29 shares up to 90% of its software and hardware with the original Bars radar while being small enough to be installed within the nose of the MiG-29 fighter. The Bars-29 has a detection range of 120 km against a target with an RCS of 5 m^{2}, 15 targets can be tracked at once when using track while scan mode, with 4 engaged at any one time. The radar has an average power output of 1 kW.

== See also ==
- Tikhomirov Scientific Research Institute of Instrument Design
- List of radars
- "Tikhomirov NIIP BARS: A Glorified Soviet-era Phased Array Radar". 12 March 2021. Archived from the original on 2021-03-12.
