= Viktor Tikhomirov =

Soviet engineer and scientist

Viktor Vasilievitch Tikhomirov (Dec. 10 (23), 1912 – Jan. 8, 1985) was a Soviet engineer and scientist in radio electronics and automation. He was a corresponding member of the Soviet Academy of Sciences, three times a laureate of the Stalin Prize, and was awarded two Orders of Lenin and other orders and medals. He led development of the first full radar system in the USSR.

== Early Background ==
Victor Tikhomirov was born in Kineshma, a medium-sized city now in Ivanovo Oblast. Upon completing secondary school, he first worked as an electrician in the Donetz Basin (Donbass) region of Eastern Ukraine, and then at the Donbass mines of Metrostroi (the operator of Moscow's subway system). In 1934, he was admitted to study radio technology at the Moscow Power Engineering Institute (MPEI – also called Moscow Energy Institute) where he finished with distinction in 1940. The Higher Attestation Commission awarded him the Doctor of Engineering degree in February 1966.

While pursuing his pre-graduation studies, Tikhomirov became a senior technician at the Nauchno-issledovatelsky institute-20 (Scientific Research Institute-20, NII-20) in Moscow, a close affiliate of the Aviapribor Plant, a manufacturer of aircraft instruments and radios. There he assisted in developing radiolokatory (radio-location, later called radar) equipment. Jointly with NII-9 in Leningrad, NII-20 developed an experimental set called Redut (Redoubt). Upon graduating from MEI, Tikhomirov was assigned as an engineer at NII-20, working in a team to improve Redut. This soon evolved to the Radio Ulavlivatel Samoletov-2 (Radio Catcher of Aircraft) designated RUS-2. Although mobile, this was a bi-static system with separated transmitter and receiver vans and antennas.

Tikhomirov's capabilities were soon recognized, and in early 1941, he was made Laboratory Head and Deputy Technical Manager of the NII-20. Engineers at the NII-20, with the cooperation of NII-9 in Leningrad, further improved the RUS-2, developing a transmit-receive device (a duplexer) allowing a single antenna, as well as a range display based on a cathode-rayoscilloscope.

== World War II Activities ==
Germany began the invasion of the Soviet Union on June 22, 1941. The NII-9 was evacuated eastward from Leningrad, and their engineers working on radio-location joined the NII-20. The major portion of the Aviapribor Plant evacuated to Kazan, and the part remaining in Moscow was designated Factory 339. To assist in defending Moscow against German aircraft, an improved RUS-2 was set up and operated by NII-20 personnel including Tikhomirov; it was first used on the night of July 22 when it detected a flight of 200 Luftwaffe bombers when they were 100-km (62-mi) away. This success led authorities to request additional radio-location sets.

Under Tikhomirov's leadership, NII-20 redesigned the RUS-2 to become a fixed radio-location station. With other improvements, this was designated the RUS-2C, and also called the Pegmatit-2 (P-2). It operated at 4 m (75 kHz) with a pulse-power of near 40 kW. This was actually the Soviet Union's first fully capable, pulsed, radio-location system; several hundred sets in different versions were produced at Factory 339. Tikhomirov received his first Stalin Award (1943) for the RUS-2C development. Throughout the war, NII-20 and Factory 339 dominated radar equipment development and fabrication in the USSR.

In late 1940, the Soviet Air Forces developed a requirement for an on-board enemy aircraft radio-location system. The NII-9 was directed to design such a set for the new Petlyakov Pe-2 dive bomber. With size and weight restrictions, a microwave design using a recently developed reflex klystron (as it was later called) was selected. The experimental set was called Gneiss and operated at 16 cm (1.8 GHz). When the war started and the NII-9 radio-location capabilities went to Moscow, NII-20 took over the development of Gneiss. Tikhomirov was assigned Chief Designer, and retained this role through all future upgrades.

The NII-20 was evacuated to Barnaul in July 1941. Under Tikhomirov's leadership, the Gneiss-2 radar was created ‘from scratch’ with limited staff and in an extremely challenging environment. At this time, the so-called ‘Tikhomirov style’ originated: frantic work schedules, extraordinary working capacity, incredible self-discipline, and insistence on high performance by the staff. In only a few months, the first pilot sets were tested with positive results.

During the battle of Stalingrad in late 1942, Tikhomirov and his design team went to the fighting scene where they installed airborne radars on Pe-2 frontline bombers and performed all set-up procedures on the spot. Official testing of the Pe-2 with Gneiss-2 onboard took place at Leningrad in 1943, and it was then that the radar was commissioned. Tikhomirov received his second Stalin Award for the Gneiss-2 design (1946).

In mid-1943, NII-20 moved back to Moscow, and in the same year Tikhomirov completed the Gneiss-2M airborne radar design. Gneiss-2 radars were also mounted on Pe-3 and Douglas A-20 aircraft. In the wartime, about 230 sets with various Gneiss designations were built. Gneiss-5 and Gneiss-5C were also put into serial production, but were not fielded until after the war.

In 1944, the aircraft radar activity was separated from NII-20 and became the Central Design Bureau-17 (TsKB-17). It was responsible for design of all airborne radars, as well as weapon control systems (WCS). Tikhomirov was assigned as deputy director for Research in TsKB-17, and remained in the role of Chief Designer in several design trends. The TsKB-17 is today the Vega Radio Engineering Corporation.

As the war was drawing to a close, TsKB-17 designed and prepared production plans for several new airborne radars, including the Argon for tail-protection of Tu-16 aircraft. The Soviet Union had begun experimenting with jet aircraft, and in support of this, Tikhomirov and the TsKB-17 initiated a number of designs for new aircraft microwave radars; these used magnetrons that had been developed in the Soviet Union.

== Post-War Defense Activities ==
In 1946, the TsKB-17 and the NII-20 were combined to form the Moscow NII-17. Tikhomirov was appointed deputy director for Research and Chief Designer of airborne radars. In 1949, he was appointed Director and Research Supervisor. In addition to completing Argon, Tikhomirov led the design of Selen (Selenium) radar systems for attack aircraft detection. His most important development at that time was the Kadmiy (Cadmium), a radar gun-sight and high-precision aircraft range-finder; he received his third Stalin Award for this work (1953).

There emerged a Tikhomirov ‘school’ of design. In this, with a comprehensive approach to the development of an aircraft, WCS was regarded as being not a just mere part or component of the aircraft, but rather a system that was as important to the aircraft as its airframe, and made the aircraft an integrated combat unit.

As a large variety of jet aircraft were being designed and produced, the NII-17 provided the needed radars. These included the Toriy (Thorium), giving the MiG-15, an “all-weather” interceptor capability, and the Izumrud (Emerald) gun-sight series, the first of which was used on the MiG-15 and MiG-17 fighters. Operating at microwave wavelengths, Izumrud used separate antennas for searching and tracking. This was the first time Tikhomirov applied automatic tracking modes, serving as a prototype for further WCS design.

An air-to-air missile, the K-5, began development in 1951. This was followed by the Topaz radar design for the Tu-16 bomber, and the Almaz (Diamond) radar for the Yak-25 and MiG-19. The Izumrud-2 was for MiG-17 PFU, carrying the RC-1U, the first Soviet guided air-to-air missile. Tikhomirov was also leading the research on an advanced, multi-functional, airborne radar system incorporating a digital computer. Ardalion Rastov served as Tikhomirov's deputy in these efforts.

In 1953, Tikhomirov was elected as a Corresponding Member of the USSR Academy of Sciences in the Department of Technical Sciences (Radio Engineering, Electronics, Automation, and Remote Control). Since Tikhomirov did not hold an academic degree at that time, this was a very unusual action by the academy.

Because of the large scope of Tikomirov's research, a branch of NII-17 was formed in Zhukovsky, an aviation research center 40 km (25 mi) southeast of Moscow. In February 1956, this branch was transformed into an independent enterprise, designated as Specialist Design Bureau-15 (OKB-15), and commonly called the Scientific Research Institute of Instrument Design (NIIP). Tikhomirov was initially the Research Supervisor, and then became Director. The first NIIP projects supervised by Tikhomirov included several models of Uragan (Hurricane) airborne radar systems for interceptor aircraft.

The title of Designer General of aviation equipment was established by the USSR Council of Ministers in 1956, and Tikhomirov was among 12 leading designers initially receiving this title. Tikhomirov was the only Designer General from the radar-WCS field; all of the others were aircraft designers.

In July 1958, the NIIP began the design of a new, highly advanced, mobile air-defense system. Eventually designated the 2k12 Kub (Cube), each battery consisted of a number of similar tracked vehicles, one of which carried a radar with a range of 75 km (47 mi), as well as an optical sighting unit. Several other design bureaus were involved in creating the Kub, all coordinated by Tikhomirov.

The Kub prototype was placed under test in August 1959. With the complex design and units from diverse sources, it was not unexpected that the initial tests were unsatisfactory. This led to changes in the design, followed by further testing, all greatly lengthening the development schedule. By the end of 1961, Tikhomirov and his team had solved the basic developmental problems, but the project was far behind schedule.

Although Tikhomirov justified two years of additional development, the Defense Ministry did not agree; consequently, Tikhomirov was relieved of his duties in 1962. Ardalion Rastov, whom he had mentored since 1953, took over as Chief Designer.

The first success came when the system downed a target aircraft in February 1964, within the two years that Tikhomirov had projected. The Kub air-defense missile system ultimately passed all testing and was commissioned into service in 1966. In NATO nations, it was called Gainful, as well as SA-6. Later it was sold internationally to 25 nations under the export name Kvadrat (Square).

The NIIP continued in developing air-defense and related systems. In 1995, it was renamed the Tikhomirov Scientific Research Institute of Instrument Design (Tikhomirov NIIP). Other portions of the original NII-17 became the Scientific Research Institute of Radar (NIIR) and, later Phazotron-NIIR. Both of these firms, as well as the previously mentioned Vega Radio Engineering, credit Tikhomirov as the technical leader of their founding organization.

Anatoly Kanashchenkovа, Director and Designer General of Phazotron-NIIR, made the following comment: “Victor Tikhomirov left a most profound imprint on today's inimitable style of doing research at our enterprise. In fact, he created an entire school of designing radars and WCSs of fighters.”

Ardalion Rastov, the person who replaced Tikhomirov on the Kub program, has been quoted as saying: “Tikhomirov organized a wonderful team, where not administrative power, but the power of common sense and reason reigned.”

== Academy of Sciences Activities ==
After leaving the NIIP, Tikhomirov was appointed by the USSR Academy of Sciences as the Head of the Biological Experiment Automation Department of the Institute of Biological Physics. The Special Design Engineering Bureau for Biological Instrumentation was established upon Tikhomirov's initiative (it is presently known as the Institute of Biological Instrument Design). Under his supervision, many devices and equipment sets for automating biological research were developed; his accomplishments in biotelemetry were particularly important.

When the Biological Instrument Design Commission was formed within the framework of the Council for Mutual Economic Assistance in the 1960s, Tikhomirov became its proactive and respected member. In 1979, Tikhomirov moved to the Institute of Oceanology, under the Academy of Sciences, where a laboratory for hydroacoustic equipment design was created upon his initiative; he worked there for the remainder of his life.

== Honors and Recognitions ==
For his accomplishments, Victor Vasilievitch Tikhomirov received the following USSR/Russian decorations:

- Three times laureate of the Stalin Prize (1943, 1945, 1953)
- Twice received Order of Lenin, the highest decoration bestowed by the USSR
- Awarded Order of the Red Star
- Received Order of the Badge of Honour
- Twice decorated with the Order of the Red Banner of Labour
- Received Medal for the Defense of Moscow
- Received Medal for the Deeds of Prowess in the Great Patriotic War
- Victor Tikhomirov commemorative plaque was placed on the wall of the building 3 at Tupolev Street in Zhukovsky, Russia
- In 1953, he was elected a Corresponding Member of the highly prestigious USSR Academy of Sciences
- In 1956, he became one of the first 12 persons who were assigned the newly introduced title of Designer General
- In 1995, his name was given to the Tikhomirov Scientific Research Institute of Instrument Design (Tikhomirov NIIP)
- In 2002, the Tikhomirov Award was introduced in the NIIP, the most prominent R&D achievement of the enterprise
- In 2004, pursuant to a resolution of the Geneva Graduate Institute of Business and Management, a nine-magnitude star in the Capricornus constellation was named after Tikhomirov and noted in the Ross Astro-Databank

== Personal Information ==
Victor V. Tikhomirov was married in February 1941 to Galina B. Troitskaya, an engineer in the textile manufacturing industry. They had two sons: Andrey V. Tikomirov (born 1941), and Vladmir V. Tikhomirov (born 1945).
