= Sukhoi Su-30MKK =

Variant version of the Su-30MK multirole fighter aircraft

Su-30MKK / Su-30MK2 (Su-30M2)
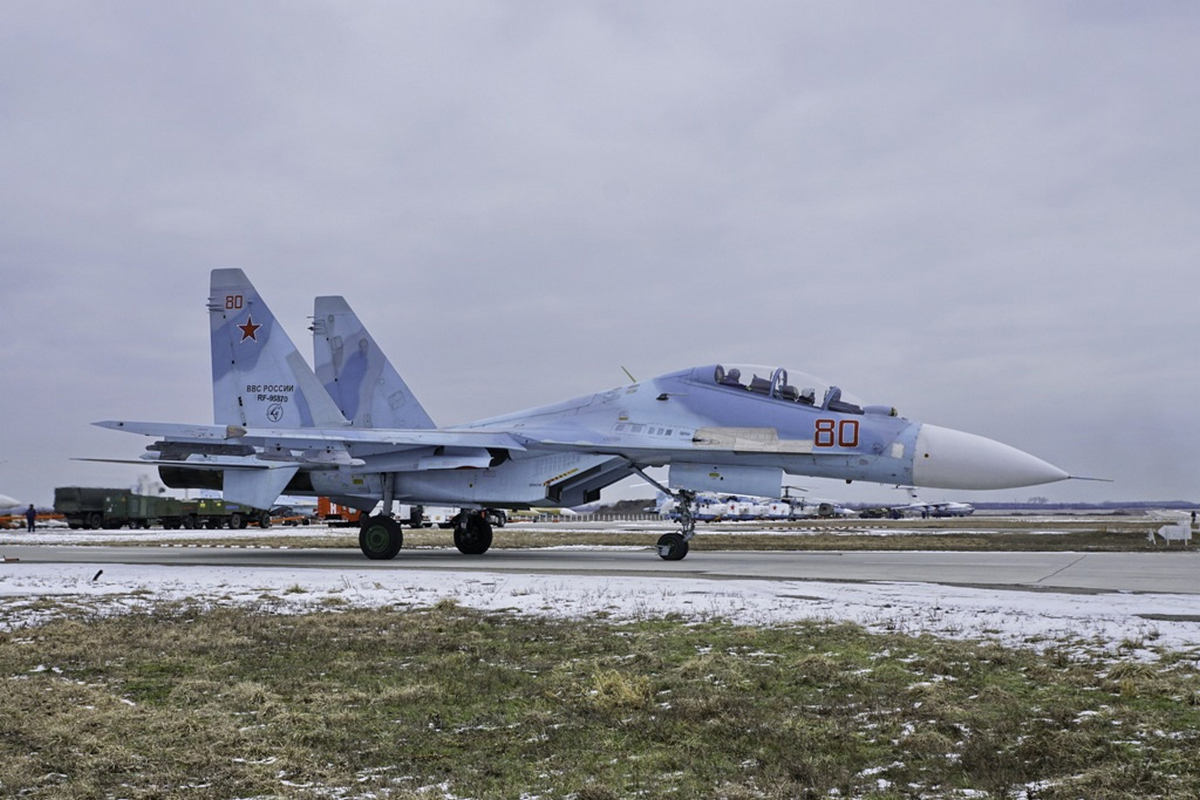
- A Russian Air Force Sukhoi Su-30M2

General information
- Type: Multirole strike fighter
- National origin: Russia
- Designer: Sukhoi
- Status: In service
- Primary users: People's Liberation Army Air Force Vietnam People's Air Force; Venezuelan Air Force

History
- Manufactured: 2000–2016
- Introduction date: December 2000
- Developed from: Sukhoi Su-30

The Sukhoi Su-30MKK (NATO reporting name: Flanker-G) (Note: MKK stands for "upgraded Chinese export version" (modernizeerovannyy kommehrcheskiy kitaiskiy)) is a Russian multirole fighter derived from the Sukhoi Su-30MK. It was developed in 1998 to Chinese requirements for a Sukhoi Su-27 with strike capabilities. The type was further developed in the early-2000s into the Sukhoi Su-30MK2 with anti-ship capabilities.

China was the first operator of the Su-30MKK and Su-30MK2. Variants of the Su-30MK2 entered service with other countries, including Russia.

== Development ==
=== Su-30MKK ===
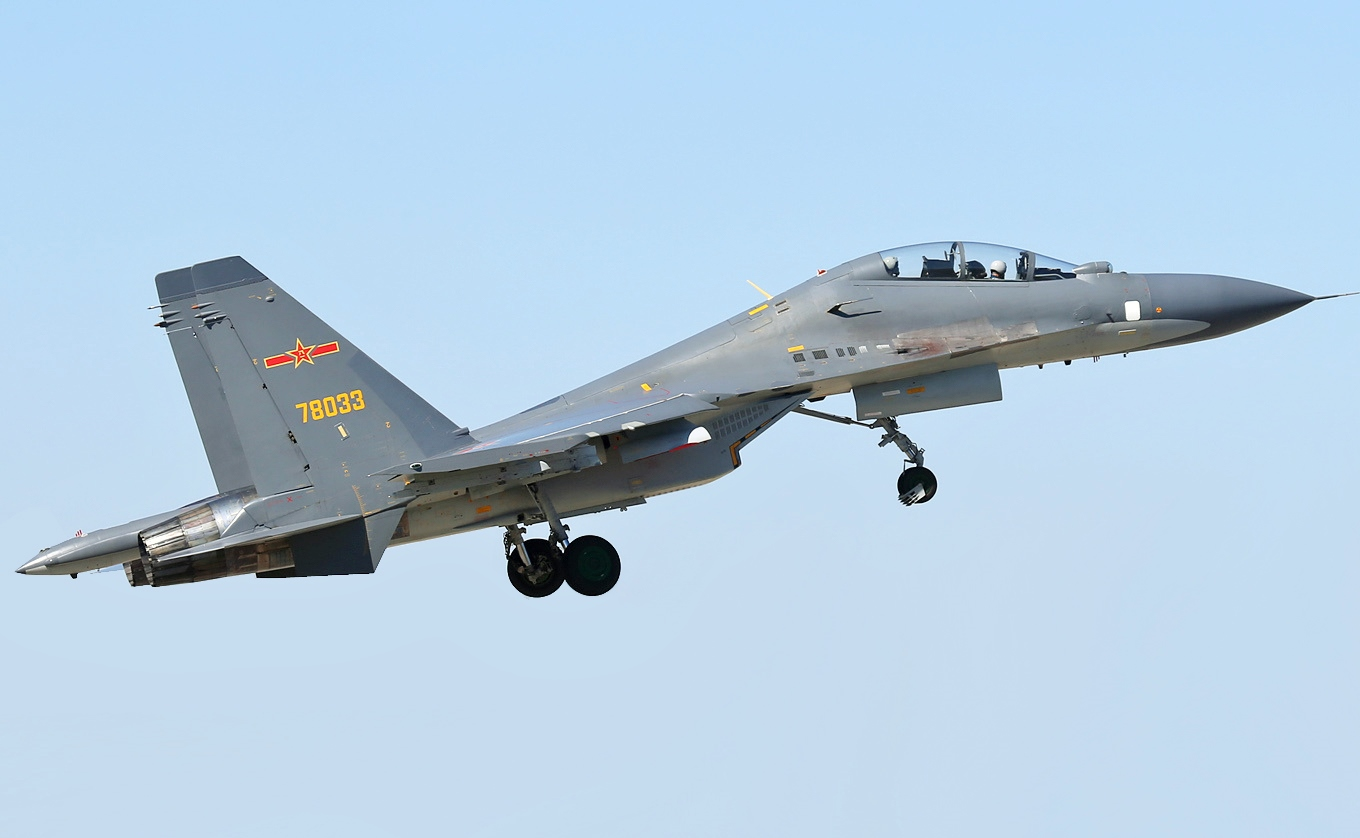
A PLAAF-colored Su-30MKK/MK2

China's military modernization that started in the late-Cold War became more urgent after the Gulf War of the early-1990s. The war demonstrated that China's modernization goals were inadequate; in 1993, the Central Military Commission issued new Military Strategic Guidelines that represented a "wholesale reevaluation" of China's military strategy. One goal was to acquire long-range precision-guided strike capability to enhance defence in depth and support offensive operations.

China began receiving Sukhoi Su-27SK fighters from Russia in 1992. By the mid-1990s, China wanted an improved Su-27 with strike capabilities. In 1996, Russia agreed to sell 40 multirole combat aircraft to China for US$1.8 billion. The contract details for the Su-30MKK were finalized at the 1998 China International Aviation & Aerospace Exhibition after technical negotiations, and a contract for 38 aircraft was signed in 1999.

The Su-30MK was chosen as the basis for the Su-30MKK, and development started in 1998. The Komsomolsk-on-Amur Aircraft Plant (KnAAPO) - which had worked on Chinese contracts - was chosen as the manufacturer and did most of the design work. The first prototype Su-30 was converted into the a demonstrator in 1999 and first flew in that form in March 1999. The first prototype was converted from an ex-Russian Air Force Su-27UB trainer that had been extensively damaged in a ground fire; it first flew as a Su-30MKK in May 1999. The second prototype was a new build and completed in the summer of 1999. Trials were largely complete by the end of 2000. Deliveries began to the People's Liberation Army Air Force (PLANAF) in December 2000.

=== Su-30MK2 ===
The Su-30MK2 was developed from a 2002 Chinese request for a Su-30MKK with anti-ship capabilities. Avionics changes integrated the Kh-31A anti-ship missile (AShM). Russia agreed to sell the aircraft to China in August 2003. KnAAPO began deliveries to the People's Liberation Army Navy Air Force in February 2004.

Russia, Venezuela and Vietnam adopted variants of the Su-30MK2 in the 2000-2010s. The Russian Air Force (VVS) variant is the Su-30M2; it was procured to sustain domestic industry and was less advanced than the Su-30SM.

== Design ==
=== Su-30MKK ===
The Su-30MKK is a development of the Su-30MK, with some of the additional features being taken from the Sukhoi Su-35. KnAAPO had proposed "combining the best features" of the Su-30MK and Su-35 before China's request. The airframe and undercarriage are reinforced to compensate for the increased weight; the nose landing gear has two wheels.

The aircraft uses the vertical stabilizers of the Su-35; these are made of carbon-fiber reinforced polymer and have fuel tanks. There is an aerial refueling probe. The engines are two Saturn AL-31F turbofans. The maximum fuel load is 22,450 pounds (10,180 kg).

The avionics suite was developed by RPKB, which also developed the software and many of the hardware components. It uses an open architecture and computers based on the Intel 486DX33 processor. The cockpit has LCD multi-function displays. The TKS-22 datalink is used; the Su-27SK used an analog voice-encoding link.

Most of the weapon control system's (WCS) air-to-air subsystem used components that were new or upgraded from the Su-27SK. The air-to-ground subsystem provides targeting data to the Kh-31P anti-radiation missile with the L-150 ELINT pack, and to the Kh-59ME with the APK-9E guidance system pod.

The N001VE radar is a N001E - used on the Su-27SK - with added air-to-ground capability.

Two wingroot hardpoints - each with a payload of 4,410 pounds (2,000 kg)- are added for a total of 12. The combined payload on all hardpoints is 8,000 kilograms (18,000 lb).

=== Su-30MK2 ===
The Su-30MK2 modifies the Su-30MKK's WCS to integrate the Kh-31A AShM. It uses the N001VEP radar, and a different head-up display and signal processor.

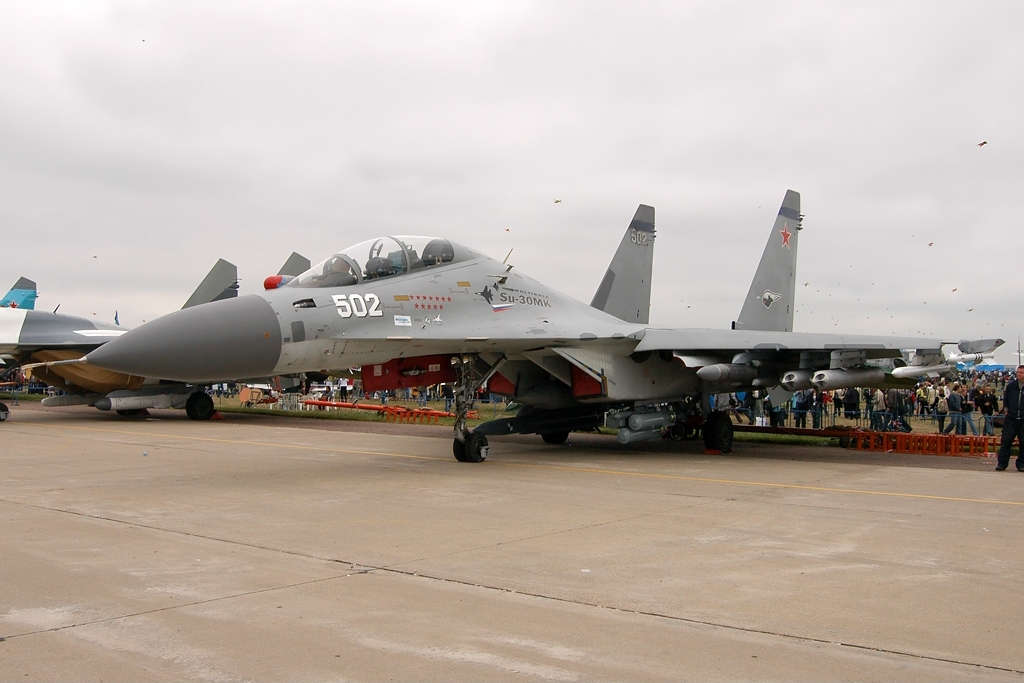
2009 static display of a Su-30MK

=== Su-30MK3 ===
The Su-30MK3 is fitted with a Phazotron Zhuk-MSE radar, possibly as part of a general avionics upgrade intended to accommodate new weapons and engines.

== Variants ==
Su-30MKK
Su-30MK2
Su-30MKV
Variant of the Su-30MK2 for Venezuela.
Su-30M2
Variant of the Su-30MK2 for Russia.

== Operators ==
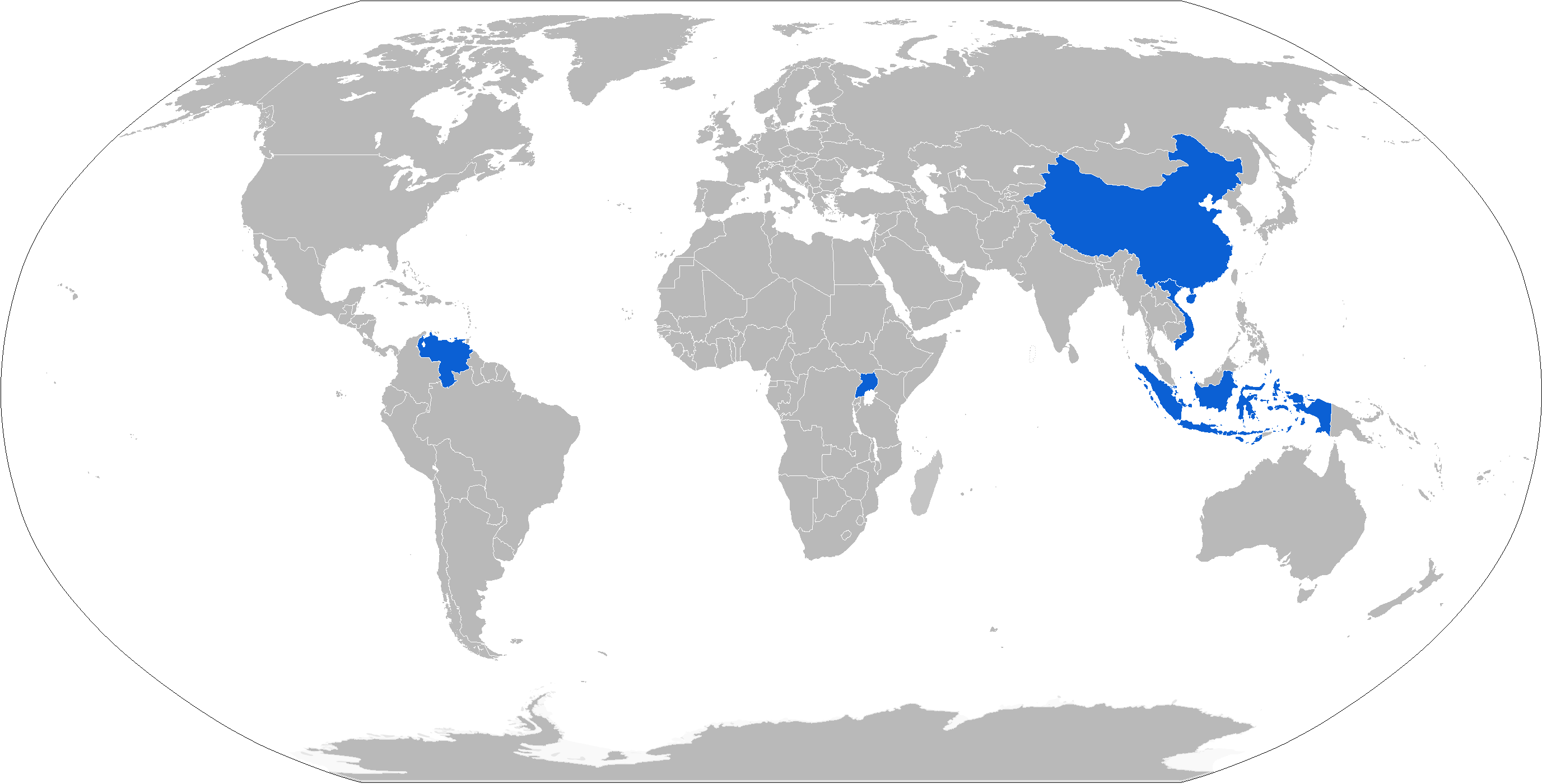
Map with Sukhoi Su-30MKK operators in blue

China

- People's Liberation Army Air Force
  - 73 Su-30MKK (as of 2024)
    38 ordered in 1999 and delivered in 2000 and 2001. Another 38 ordered in 2001 and delivered by 2003.
  - 24 Su-30MK2 (as of 2024)
    24 ordered in 2003 and delivered in 2004 to the PLANAF; transferred to the PLAAF by 2024.

Indonesia

- Indonesian Air Force: 9 or 11 Su-30MK2 (as of 2024) According to SIPRI, three ordered in 2008 and delivered by 2009, and another six ordered 2012 and delivered by 2013.

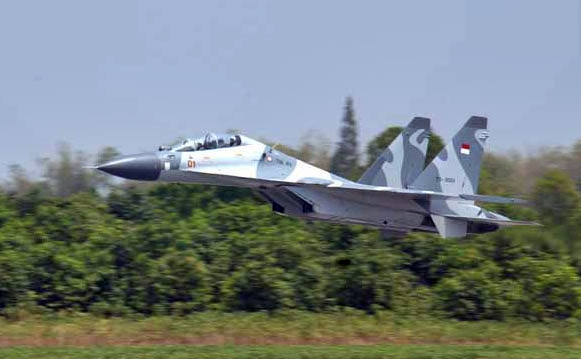
Indonesian Air Force Su-30MK2.

Russia

- Russian Air Force: 19 Su-30M2 (as of 2024). 20 delivered; first batch by 2009 and a second by 2012.

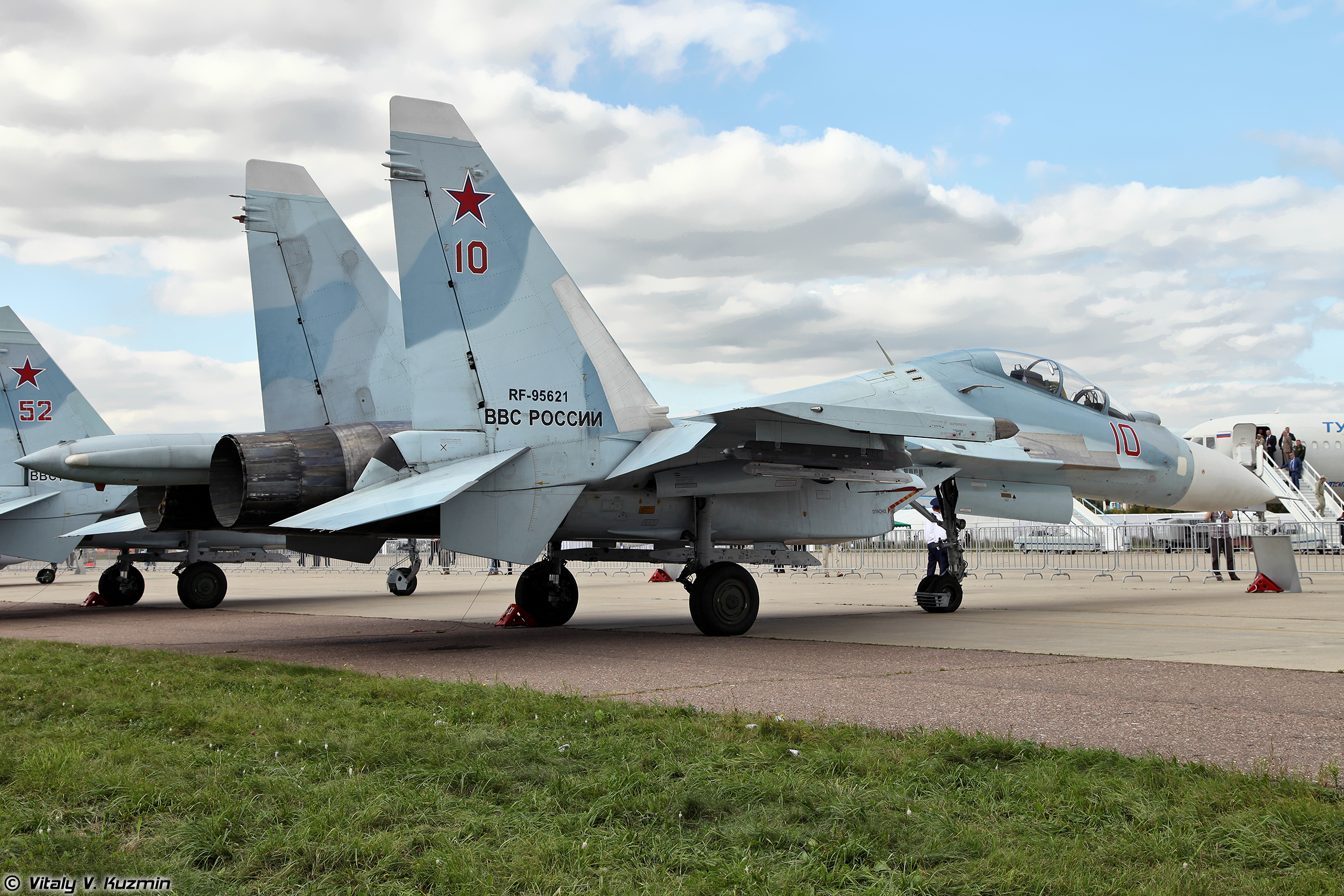
A Su-30M2 in Russian colors.

Uganda

- Uganda Air Force: 6 Su-30MK2 (as of 2024). 6 ordered in 2010 for US$635 million and delivered by 2012.

Venezuela

- Venezuelan Air Force: 14 Su-30MKV (as of 2026). According to SIPRI, 24 ordered in 2006 and delivered by 2008. One crashed during an interception in September 2015; both crew killed. One crashed in October 2019; both crew killed. One crashed during an exercise in mid-2023; one crew killed.

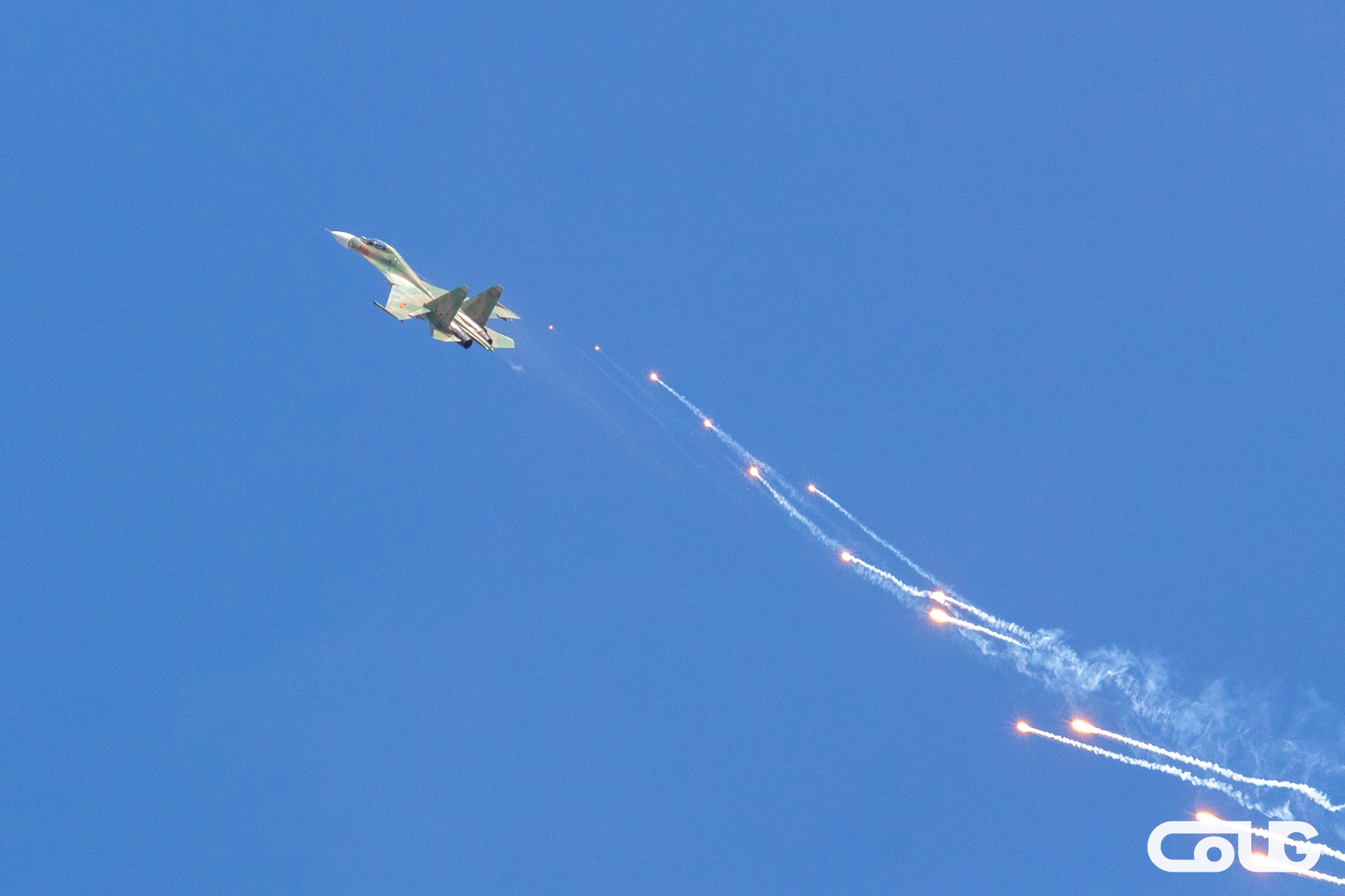
Vietnam People's Air Force Su-30MK2 deploying flares during the rehearsal of the 50th anniversary of the Reunification Day ceremony in April 2025.

Vietnam

- Vietnam People's Air Force: 35 Su-30MK2 (as of 2024). Four ordered in 2003 and delivered in 2004. Eight ordered in 2009 and delivered by 2011. 12 ordered in 2010 and delivered by 2012. 12 ordered in 2013 and delivered by 2016. One crashed at sea in June 2016; one crew killed.

== Specifications (Su-30MKK/MK2) ==
Data from KnAAPO, deagel.com, and Rosoboronexport

General characteristics

- Crew: 2
- Length: 21.9 m (71 ft 10 in)
- Wingspan: 14.7 m (48 ft 3 in)
- Height: 6.36 m (20 ft 10 in)
- Gross weight: 24,900 kg (54,895 lb)
- Max takeoff weight: 34,500 kg (76,059 lb)
- Fuel capacity: 9,640 kg (21,250 lb) internal
- Powerplant: 2 × Lyulka AL-31F afterburning turbofan engines, 122.6 kN (27,600 lbf) with afterburner

Performance

- Maximum speed: 2,120 km/h (1,320 mph, 1,140 kn) at high altitude, or 1,400 kilometres per hour (870 mph) at low altitude
- Maximum speed: Mach 2
- Range: 3,000 km (1,900 mi, 1,600 nmi) with 24,900 kilograms (54,900 lb) take-off weight at cruise altitude, or 1,270 kilometres (790 mi) with the same TOW at low altitude
- Service ceiling: 17,300 m (56,800 ft)
- g limits: +9g
- Thrust/weight: 1
- Take-off run: 550 m (1,804 ft)

Armament

- Guns: 1 × 30 mm Gryazev-Shipunov GSh-30-1 autocannon with 150 rounds
- Rockets: various unguided rockets
- Missiles:
  - Air-to-air missiles:
    - R-73E
    - R-27
    - R-77
  - Air-to-surface missiles:
    - Kh-29T
    - Kh-59ME
  - Anti-radiation missiles:
    - Kh-31P
- Bombs:
  - KAB-500L laser-guided bomb
  - KAB-1500L laser-guided bomb
  - various unguided bombs

Avionics

- NIIP Myech fire-control radar
- Sorbtsiya electronic countermeasures pods
- L150 Pastel Radar Warning Receiver

== See also ==
Related development

- Sukhoi Su-30
- Sukhoi Su-30MKA
- Sukhoi Su-30MKI
- Sukhoi Su-30MKM
- Shenyang J-16

Aircraft of comparable role, configuration, and era

- McDonnell Douglas F-15E Strike Eagle

Related lists

- List of fighter aircraft

== Sources ==
- Gordon, Yefim (2007). Sukhoi Su-27 Flanker. Famous Russian Aircraft. Hinkley, England: Midland Publishing. ISBN 978-1-85780-247-4.
- International Institute for Strategic Studies (2025). The Military Balance 2025. London: Routledge. ISBN 978-1-041-04967-8.
- Kostecka, Daniel J. (2014). "Aerospace Power and China's Counterstrike Doctrine in the Near Seas". China's Near Seas Combat Capabilities. CMSI Red Book. Vol. 11. China Maritime Studies Institute. ISBN 978-1-935352-16-7.
- Nersisyan, Leonid (17 December 2020). Russian Combat Aviation: Procurement, Modernization, and Future Outlook (PDF) (Report). CNA. IOP-2020-U-028810-Final.
- Wei, Bai (May 2012). "A Flanker by any other name". Air Forces Monthly. No. 290. London: Key Publishing.
