= Mech radar =

Type of multimode aircraft radar

N001
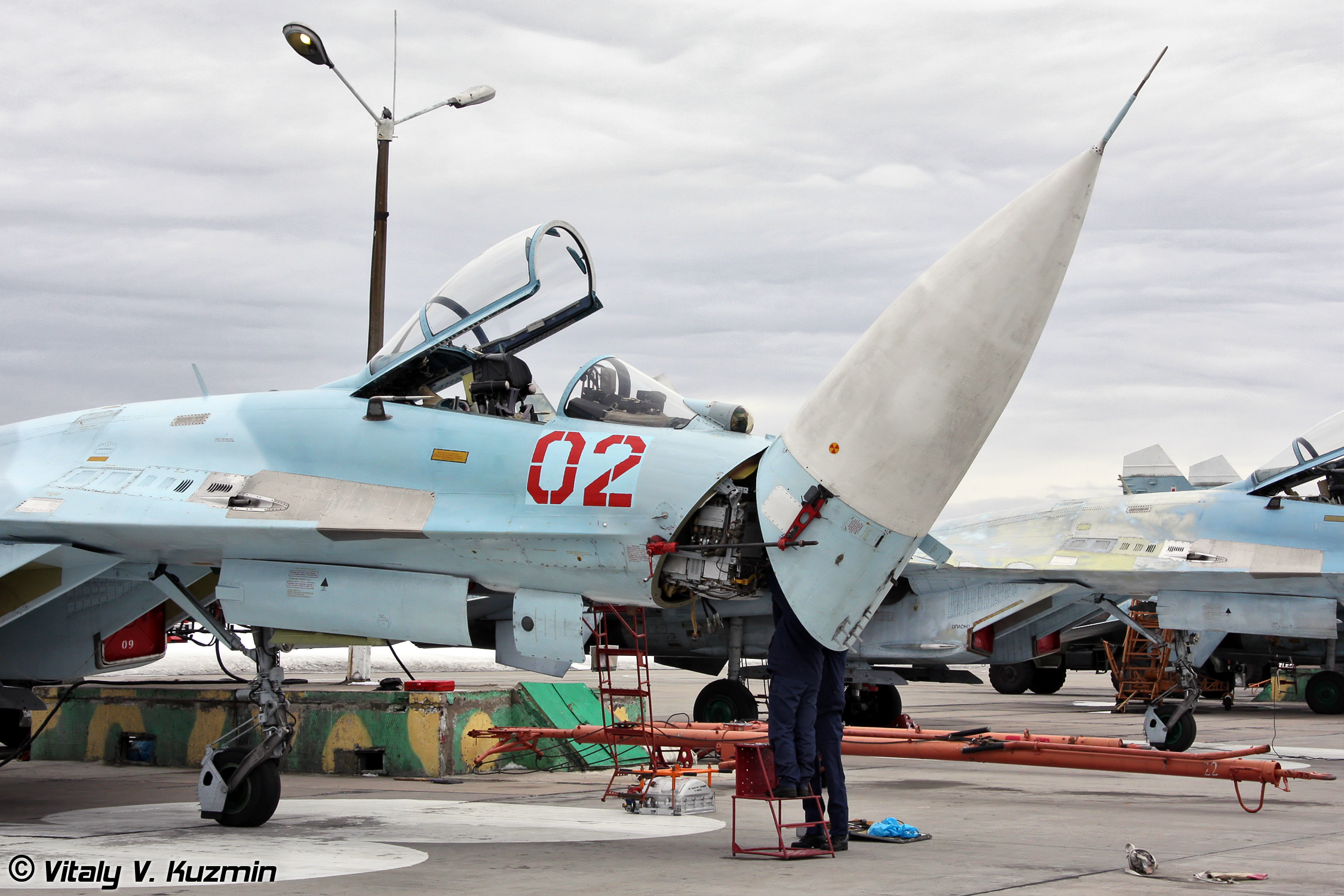
- The Mech radars are used on the Su-27 and Su-30MK variants
- Country of origin: Soviet Union/Russia
- Introduced: 1985
- Type: Twist cassegrain PESA antenna (N001VEP+Pero)
- Frequency: X-band
- Range: 100km (fighter); 140km (bomber); 65km (track range)
- Diameter: 1.075m
- Azimuth: ±60
- Elevation: -55 +60
- Power: 1kw (average)

N001 Mech (Russian: Меч, lit. 'Sword') is a Russian (former USSR) all-weather multimode airborne radar developed by the Tikhomirov Scientific Research Institute of Instrument Design (NIIP) for the Su-27 multi-role combat aircraft. The NATO reporting name for the radar is Slot Back II, shared with the MiG-29's N019 Rubin radar (Slot Back I) due to the similar electronics characteristics.

== Description ==
The N001 radar for the Su-27 was designed by Viktor Grishin. Pushing the state of the art for the USSR, the original design, known as Mech, was supposed to draw heavily on technologies developed for the experimental Soyuz radar program led by NPO Istok. It was intended to have a great deal of commonality with the MiG-29's N019 Rubin radar. N001 has a 1.075m antenna diameter twist-cassegrain antenna. A pulse-doppler design operating in the 3 cm band using medium and high PRFs for optimum lookdown capability, the N001 has a search range of 80–100 km against a 3m^{2} RCS target in a headon engagement, 140 km against a large bomber. It can track a 3m^{2} target at 65 km. In a pursuit engagement, search range for a 3m^{2} target falls to just 40 km. Azimuth limits are ±60. Initial units had a MTBF of only 5 hours, but later type is 100 hours; MTBF was eventually brought up to 200 hours. The Su-33 used an updated SUV-33 control system, the N001 radar was largely unchanged but with sea optimised lookdown capability and support for the carrier-based GCI system.

== Variants ==
N001 (RLPK-27)
Standard model.
N001E
Export version of N001.
N001V (RLPK-27V)
Processor replaced TS101M capable of single target engagement and simultaneously tracking 10 targets during an engagement.
N001VE (RLPK-27VE)
Simplified export version of the N001V or an upgrade of the N001E with added air-to-ground capabilities. New computer hardware and software, possibly including the Baguet-55 signal processor, integrated the R-77 air-to-air missile. It has an all-weather ground mapping mode for detecting land and sea targets. The detection range is 62.1 miles (99.9 km). It can track ten targets simultaneously and engage two with the R-77. Fitted to the Sukhoi Su-30MKK.
N001VEP (RLPK-27VEP)
Includes a separate computing channel for synthetic aperture terrain-mapping. Integrates the Kh-31A anti-ship missile. The detection range is 68.4 miles (110.1 km). Fitted to the Sukhoi Su-30MK2. A sub-variant of this radar with the Pero passive electronically scanned array (PESA) antenna, sometimes nicknamed "Panda", was flight tested although not adopted by any services.

== See also ==
- Tikhomirov Scientific Research Institute of Instrument Design
- List of radars

== Sources ==
- Gordon, Yefim (2007). Sukhoi Su-27 Flanker. Famous Russian Aircraft. Hinkley, England: Midland Publishing. ISBN 978-1-85780-247-4.
- Wei, Bai (May 2012). "A Flanker by any other name". Air Forces Monthly. No. 290. London: Key Publishing.
