= Byelka (radar) =

Type of radar system

N036 Belka
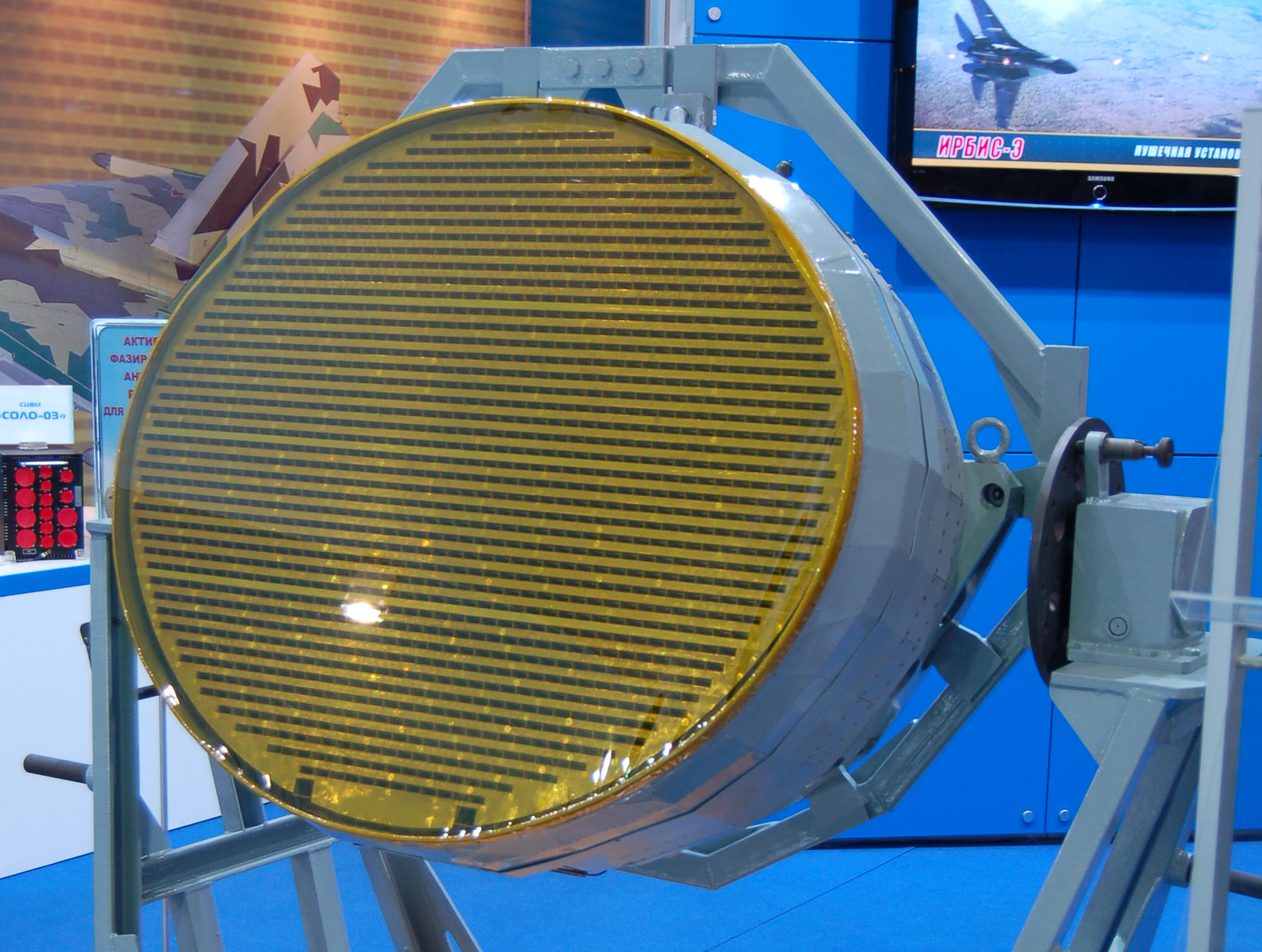
- NIIP's Belka AESA radar for the Su-57 on display at the MAKS airshow

General information
- Type: X-Band, L-Band active electronically scanned array
- National origin: Russia
- Manufacturer: Tikhomirov NIIP
- Designer: Tikhomirov NIIP
- Status: Operational (2020)
- Primary user: Russian Air Force

History
- Developed from: Irbis-E

N036 Byelka (Russian: Белка, literally Squirrel) is an active electronically scanned array radar system developed by Tikhomirov NIIP for the fifth generation Sukhoi Su-57 fighter aircraft.

== Design ==
The radar is a part of Sh121 multifunctional integrated radio electronic system (MIRES) onboard the Su-57. The N036 radar system is developed by Tikhomirov NIIP Institute and consists of a main nose-mounted X-band AESA radar with 1,514 T/R modules, designated the N036-1-01, and two smaller X-band AESA radars with 404 T/R modules (2,322 T/R modules total) mounted on the sides of the forward fuselage designated N036B-1-01. The suite also has two N036L-1-01 L-band arrays on the wing's leading edge extensions that are not only used for friend-or-foe identification but also for electronic warfare purposes. Computer processing of the X- and L-band signals enable the systems information to be significantly enhanced. It has the ability to track 60 targets and shoot 16 targets in the air simultaneously, or engage up to four targets on land at the same time. The L402 "Himalayas" electronic countermeasures (ECM) suite made by the KNIRTI institute uses both its own arrays and that of the N036 radar.

In 2012, ground tests of the N036 radar began on the third (T-50-3) and fifth (T-50-5) Su-57 prototype aircraft. Tikhomirov-NIIP has delivered six forward-looking prototype N036 Byelka radar for Su-57 fighter jets.

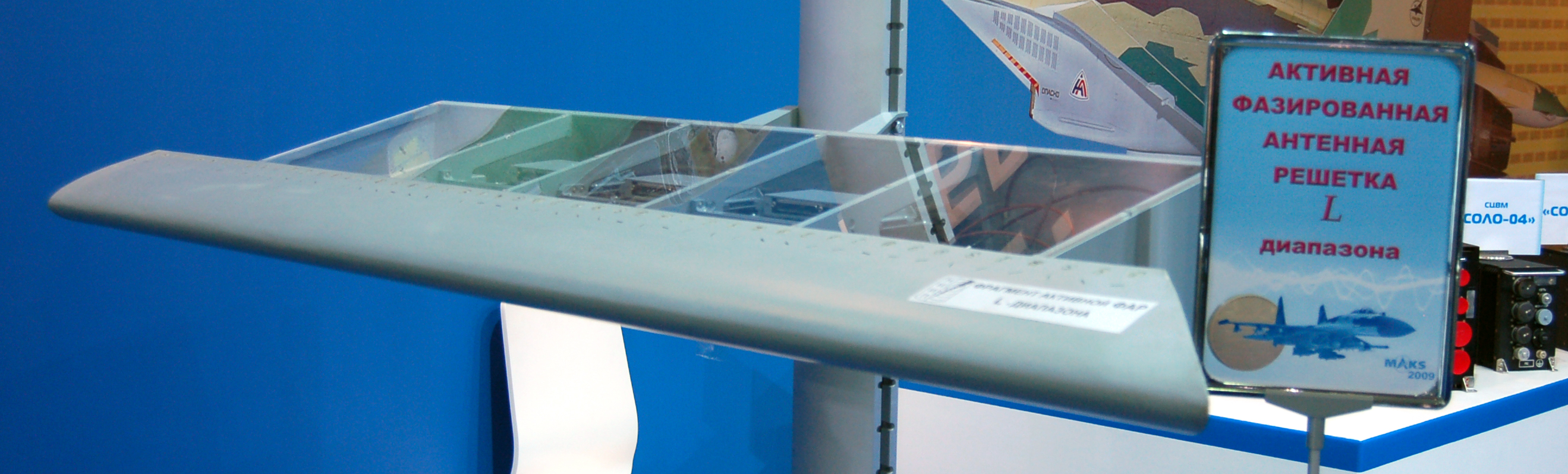
N036L-1-01 L-band array

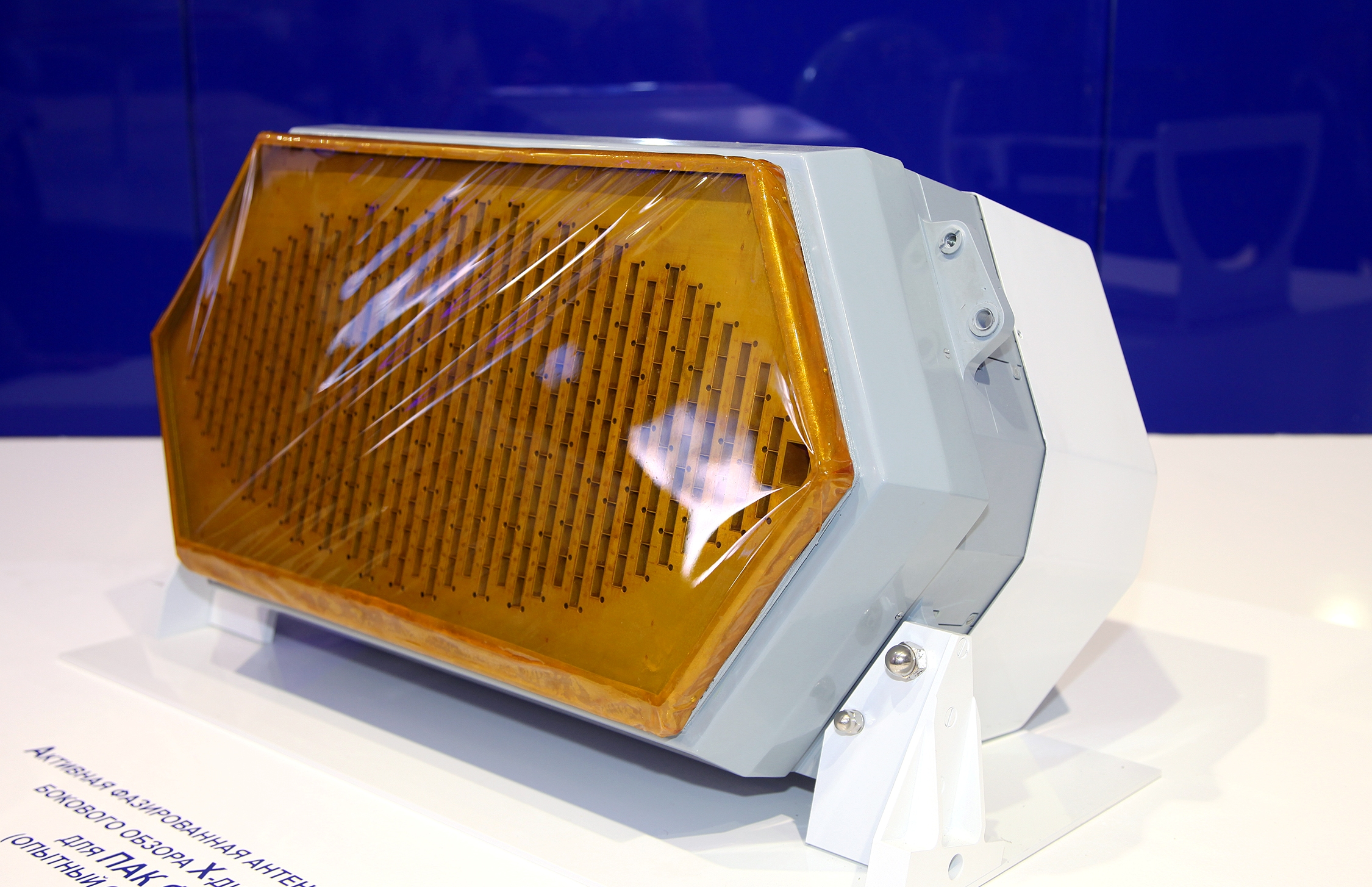
N036B-1-01B AESA radar on display at the 2013 MAKS airshow
