= OPS-12 =

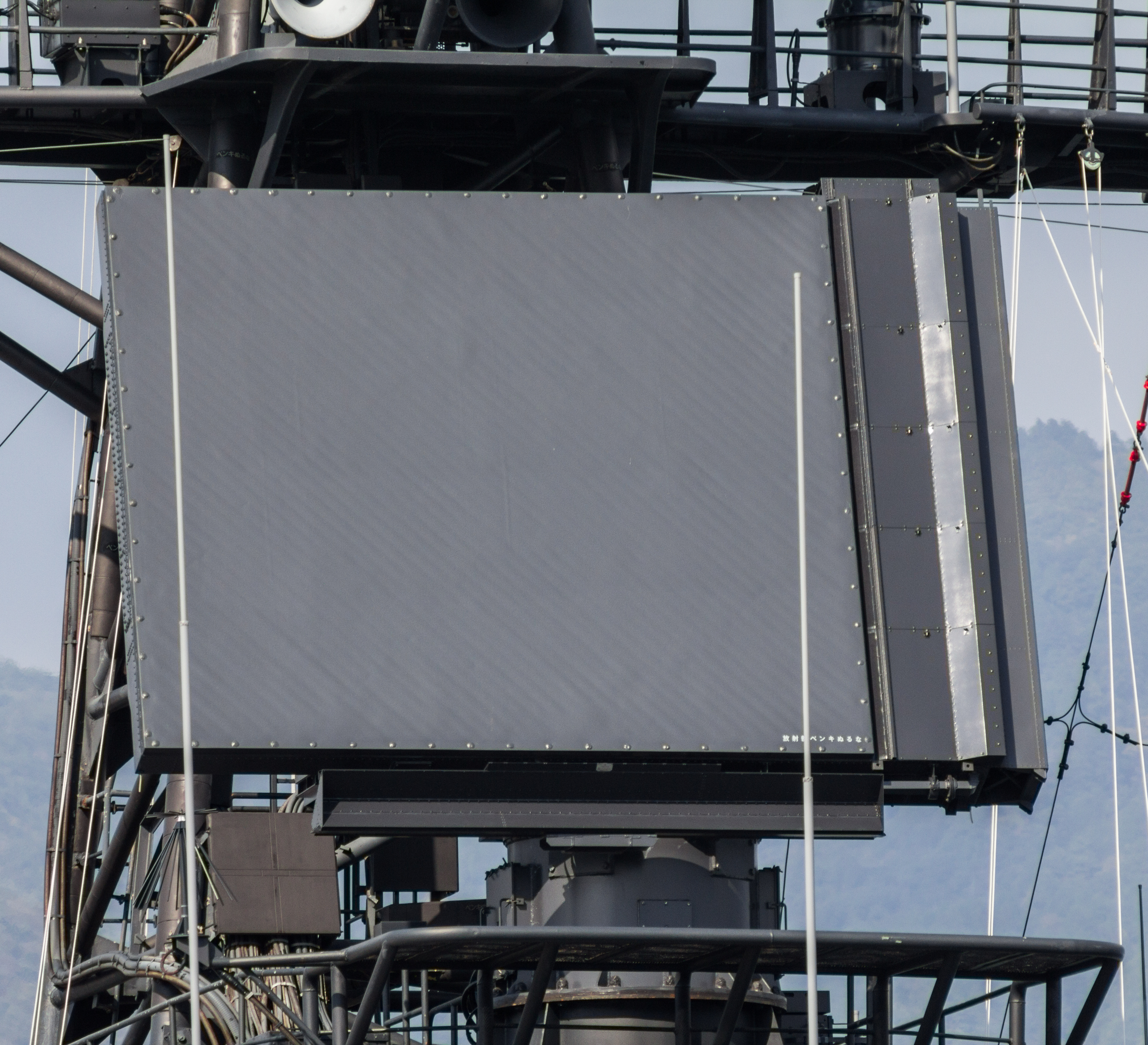
- OPS-12 on JDS Kurama (DDH-144)
- Country of origin: Japan
- Introduced: 1980
- Type: 3D Air-search
- Frequency: S band
- Range: 200km+
- Azimuth: 0-360°

OPS-12 is a shipborne long range air search 3D radar adopting passive electronically scanned array (PESA) technology. It was one of the first PESA radars employed on an operational warship, introduced in 1980 by the Japan Maritime Self-Defense Force. The OPS-12 is reported to have a range of more than 200km, and a target passive track capability of up to 100 contacts simultaneously.

It has largely been superseded by more advanced radars in the JMSDF.

== See also ==
- AN/SPS-52
