= Irbis-E =

Russian fighter jet radar

Irbis-E radar
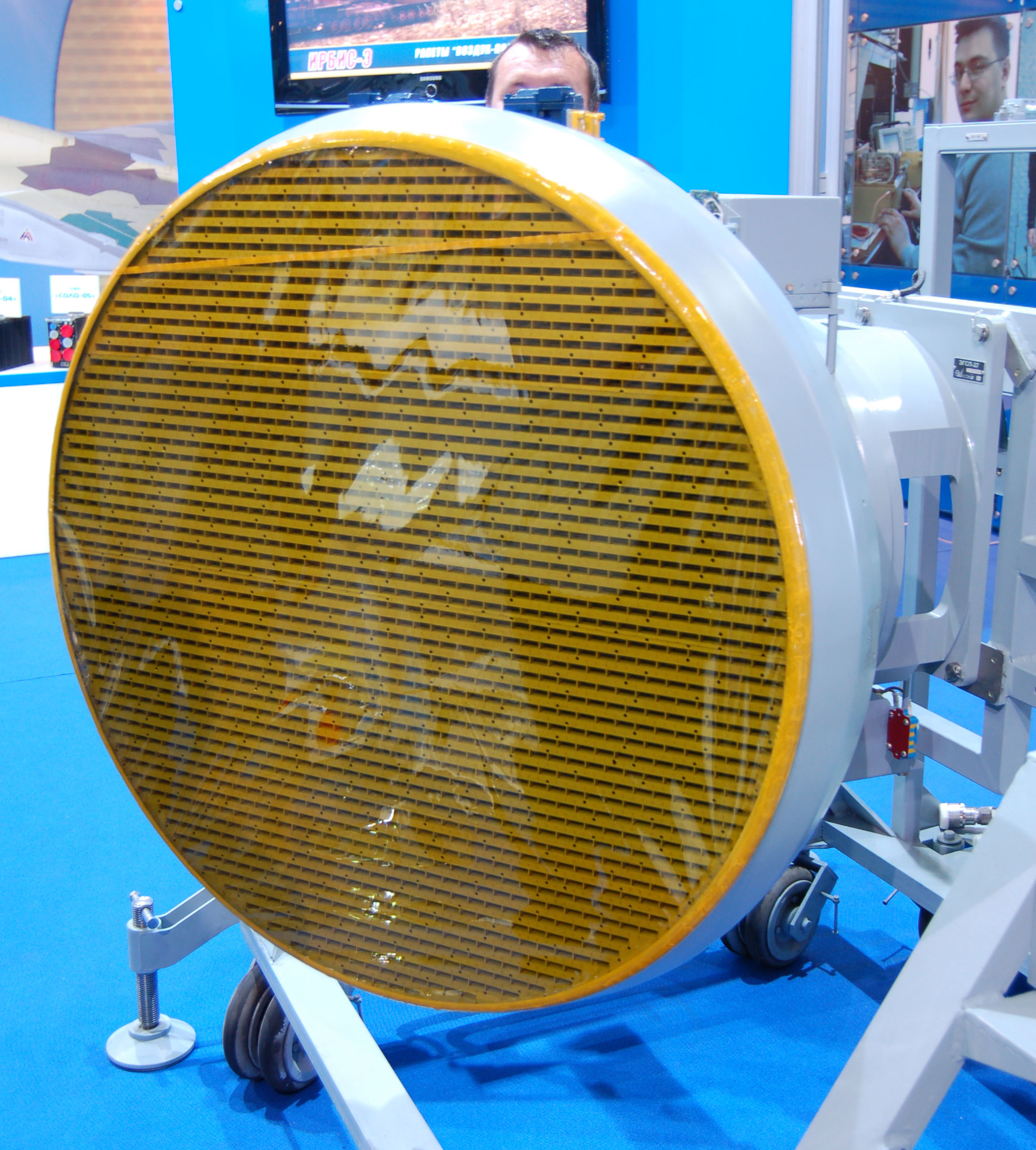

General information
- Type: X band Hybrid Passive electronically scanned array
- National origin: Russia
- Manufacturer: Tikhomirov NIIP
- Designer: Tikhomirov NIIP
- Status: Operational
- Primary user: Russian Air Force

History
- Developed from: Bars radar
- Developed into: Byelka

The N035 Irbis-E (Snow Leopard) is a Russian multi-mode, hybrid passive electronically scanned array radar system developed by Tikhomirov NIIP for the Sukhoi Su-35 multi-purpose fighter aircraft. NIIP developed the Irbis-E radar from the N011M Bars radar system used on Sukhoi Su-30MKI aircraft.

== Design ==
The N035 Irbis-E development started in 2004 and the first radar prototype entered flight tests on board an Su-30M2 aircraft acting as a test bed in early 2007. The resulting radar system provides air-to-air, air-to-sea and air-to-ground (ground mapping, Doppler beam sharpening and Synthetic Aperture Radar modes) modes with improved performance in intense clutter (radar) environments compared to its predecessor, the Bars system. In addition, Irbis has been designed to detect low and super-low observable/stealth airborne threats.

This is an multifunctional X band multi-role radar with a passive phased antenna array (PAA) mounted on a two-step hydraulic drive unit (60° in azimuth and elevation). The antenna device scans by an electronically controlled beam in azimuth and angle of elevation in sectors not smaller than 60°. The two-step electro-hydraulic drive unit additionally turns the antenna by mechanic means to 60° in azimuth and 120° in elevation. Thus, in using the electronic control and mechanical additional turn of the antenna, the maximum deflection angle of the beam grows to 120°. The radar employs 900mm passive phased array antenna mounted on a hydraulic actuator. The Irbis-E antenna is cited to house 1,772 radiating elements. The radar, designated N035, is integrated into the Sh135 weapons control complex alongside other systems such as the Khibiny-M electronic warfare system.

The Irbis-E is a direct evolution of the BARS design, but significantly more powerful. While the hybrid phased array antenna is retained, the noise figure is slightly worse at 3.5 dB, but the receiver has four rather than three discrete channels. The biggest change is in the EGSP-27 transmitter, where the single 7-kilowatt peak power rated Chelnok TWT is replaced with a pair of 10-kilowatt peak power rated Chelnok tubes, ganged to provide a total peak power rating of 20 kilowatts. The radar is cited at an average power rating of 5 kilowatts, with 2 kilowatts CW rating for illumination. NIIP claim twice the bandwidth and improved frequency agility over the BARS, and better ECCM capability. The Irbis-E has new Solo-35.01 digital signal processor hardware and Solo-35.02 data processor, but retains receiver hardware, the master oscillator and exciter of the BARS. A prototype has been in flight test since late 2005.

== Operational features ==
According NIIP's product specification, the Irbis-E can detect and track up to 30 airborne targets at a time and attack up to 8. In air-to-surface mode the Irbis-E provides mapping allowing to attack four surface targets with precision-guided weapons while scanning the horizon searching for airborne threats that can be engaged using semi-active radar homing missiles. In air-to-surface mode, the radar has a limited SAR resolution.

It can detect a target with radar cross-section (RCS) 3m^{2} at up to 400 km when searching in a narrow FOV, 200 km otherwise. In track-while-scan mode, the radar can engage two targets with semi-active radar homing missiles.

== Application ==
In 2007, the first radar prototype entered flight tests on board an Su-30MK2 aircraft. Tikhomirov NIIP Irbis-E radar is operational with the Su-35 multi-purpose fighter aircraft and the Su-30SM2.

== See also ==
- "RLSU "Irbis-E"".
- "Tikhomirov NIIP BARS: A Glorified Soviet-era Phased Array Radar". 12 March 2021. Archived from the original on 2021-03-12.
