= Gneiss-2 =

Gneiss-2 was the first Soviet produced airborne radar system. It was introduced in 1942, and was installed on Petlyakov Pe-2, Petlyakov Pe-3 and Douglas A-20 Havoc aircraft.

== Development ==
During the Soviet-Finnish War, the chief of the Air Force Research and Testing Institute, General S. A. Danilin, having gained experience of the ground-based Redoubt Radar Redox (RUS-2) under combat conditions, proposed developing an airborne radar system for detecting and attacking enemy aircraft regardless of visibility conditions. Scientists and engineers at the Leningrad Institute of Radio Industries confirmed the possibility of creating such a system, and under the leadership of A. B. Slepushkin the development of the project, codenamed "Gneiss-1", was started. The Institute of Air Force put forward the following requirements: range of detection of the aircraft 4-5 km; detection zone in the horizontal plane 120 °, in the vertical - about 90 °. The transmitter was based on a klystron, working at a wavelength of 15-16 cm in pulsed mode. The estimated weight of the station and equipment was about 500 kg. The aircraft chosen to install the system was at the suggestion of the test pilot of the Air Force Research Institute, S. Suprun, in which the radar operator could also be accommodated. In early 1941, a prototype of the radar was created.

In connection with the outbreak of the Great Patriotic War and the evacuation of the supplier enterprises, difficulties arose with further work on the Gneiss-1. The design of the radar had to be switched to transmitters of a meter wave band. On the basis of the fixed air-defense radar " Pegmatit " (RUS-2s) under the direction of its developers A. A. Fin and V. V. Tikhomirov, the Gneiss-2 radar was created, operating at a wavelength of 1.5 m.

The radar was installed on a Pe-2 aircraft and in July 1942 test flights showed the possibility of detecting a bomber-type aircraft at a distance of 300 to 3500 m with an accuracy of ± 5 ° in angular coordinates with a flight altitude of at least 2000 m. The radio research institute completed a pilot batch of 15 stations that were sent to the troops for testing. In February-May 1943, under the Leningrad 2nd Guards Air Defense Corps, official military tests were conducted (the chairman of the commission, Major General of Aviation Ye. E. Erlykin ). According to their results, by decision of the State Defense Committee of June 16, 1943, Gneiss-2 radar was adopted. By the end of 1944, more than 230 of the systems were released.

In 1943, an improved version of the station, Gneiss-2M, was created. On it, new antennas were used, which made it possible to detect both airplanes and surface ships. In the autumn of 1943, the radar was tested on the Caspian Sea, after which it was adopted and launched into mass production.

== Specifications ==
- Carrier frequency: 200 MHz
- Pulse frequency: 900 Hz
- Pulse duration: 2μs to 2.5 μs
- Maximum range: 3,5 km
- Peak power: 10 kW
- Azimuth error: ± 5 °

== Combat operation ==
The first operational "Gneiss-2" radar systems, mounted on the Pe-2 aircraft, were used in battles near Moscow in the autumn of 1942. At the beginning of 1943 some aircraft were used in combat against aircraft supplying the German units surrounded at Stalingrad. From February to May 1943, aircraft with the radar were used in the air defense system of Leningrad - by the 24th Guards Fighter Aviation Regiment of the Second Air Defense Corps. During the interception, the fighters were guided to the target using the RUS-2 long-range radar, and with the approach to the air enemy, the airborne Gneiss-2 was ready to be used. Having discovered the enemy aircraft, the on-board radar operator gave the pilot instructions on how to approach the target.

From February to June 1943, Gneiss-2 was tested with a Douglas A-20 to evaluate its use as a night fighter airborne interception radar. In comparison with Pe-2, the aircraft had a number of advantages, and as a result, in July 1943, the formation of the 56th Air Division of long-range fighters in the two regiments (45 and 173) on A-20 aircraft began. The division was subordinate to the ADD. According to the staff, each regiment was assigned 32 aircraft and 39 crews, and the regiment included a radar company equipped with the RUS-2. From May 1944 divisions began to enter the front and were used to protect large transport hubs. The planes with the Gneiss-2 radar were also used during the war by the mine-torpedo aviation regiments to detect ships.

In addition to the "Gneiss-2" of its own production, the USSR received aviation radars under a Lend-Lease contract. The United States sent to the allies under this treaty 54,486 aviation radars, mainly for Great Britain. Of this number, 370 stations of two types were sent to the Soviet Union: 320 - SCR-695 and 50 - SCR-718.
