= Tikhomirov Scientific Research Institute of Instrument Design =

Russian developer of weaponry control systems

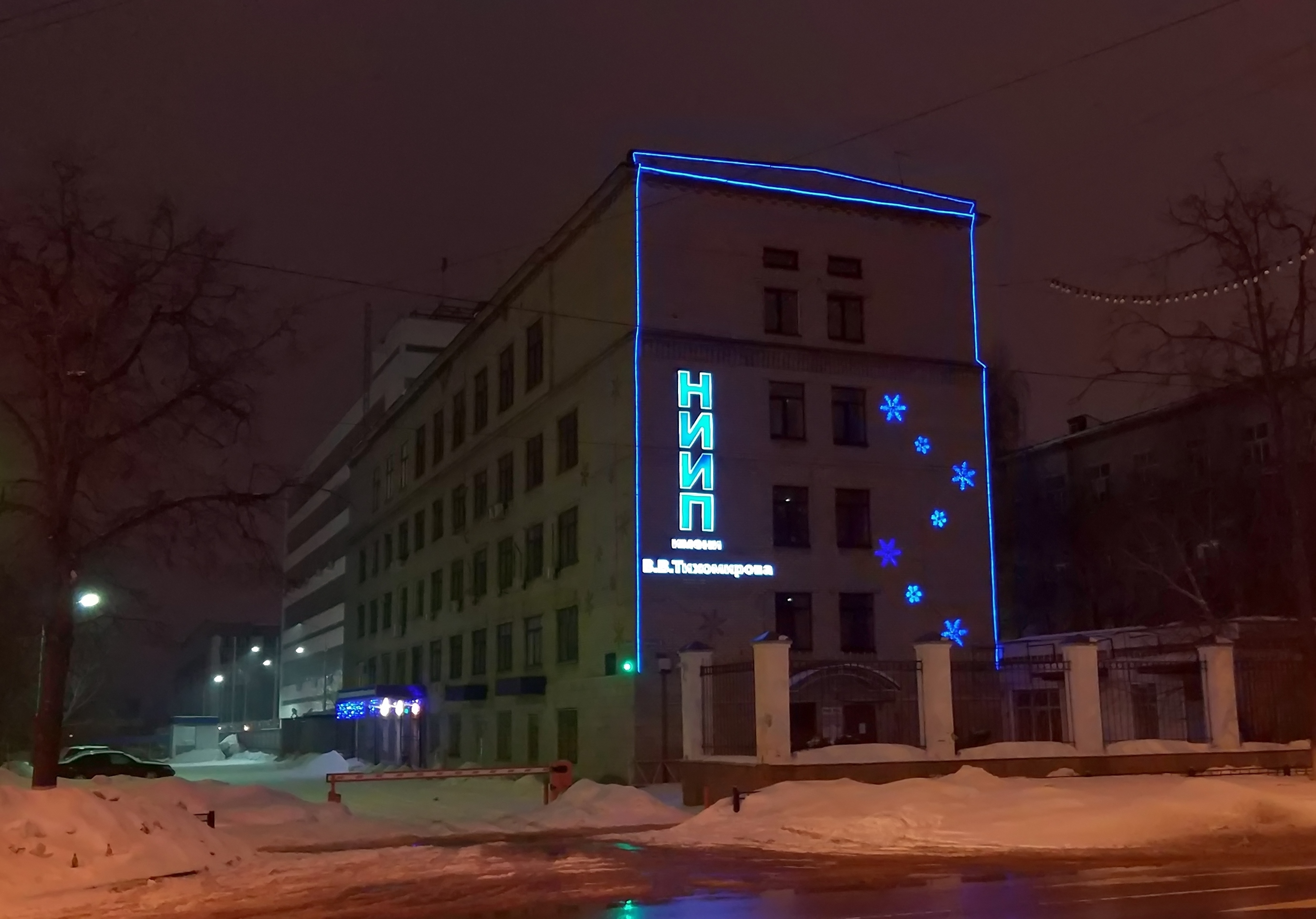
- Native name: Научно-исследовательский институт приборостроения имени В. В. Тихомирова
- Type: Joint stock company
- Industry: Radio-frequency engineering
- Founded: 1955; 71 years ago
- Headquarters: Zhukovsky, Russia
- Area served: Europe and Asia
- Products: Radars, Radar seekers, Phased Array Antennas and Aircraft Weapon Control Systems, Medium Range Air Defense Missile Systems, Radar Control Systems, Missiles
- Owner: Russian Federation
- Number of employees: 2,109
- Parent: Almaz-Antey
- Website: www.niip.ru (in Russian)

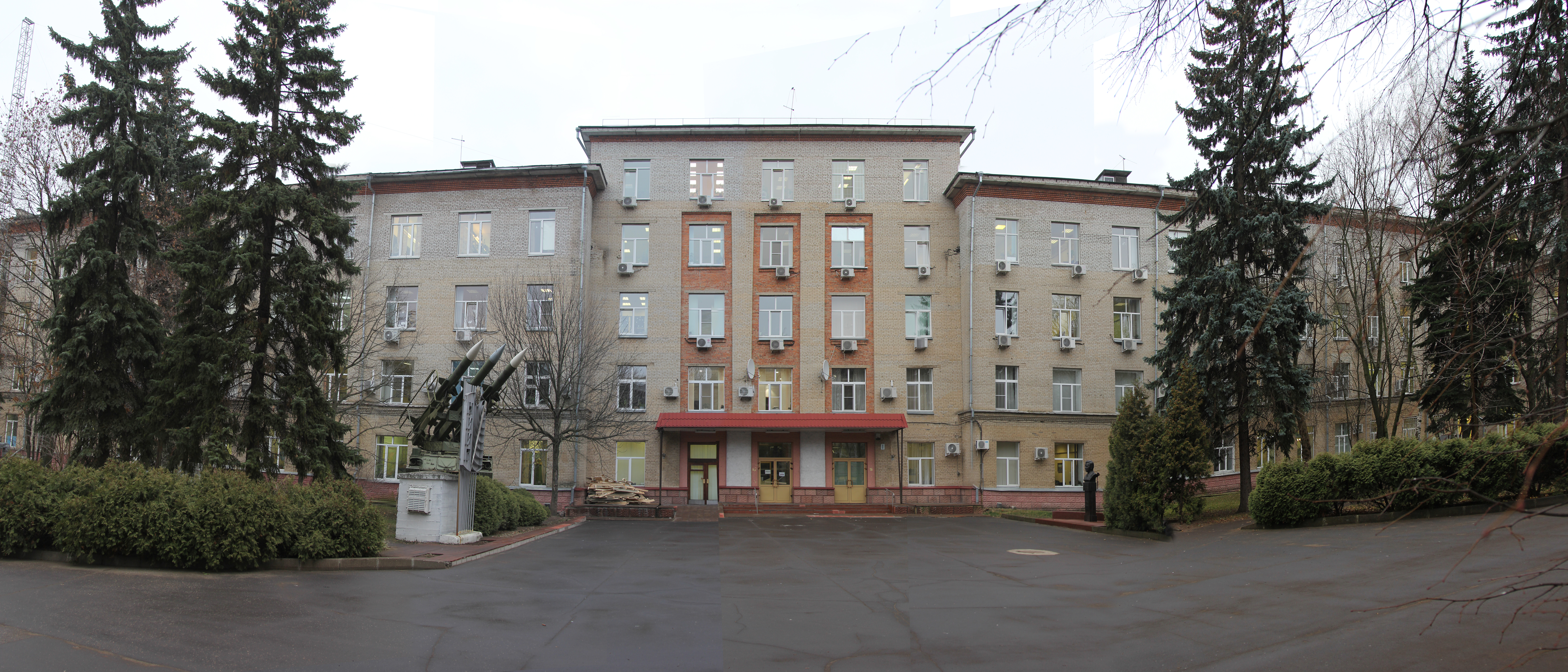
NIIP headquarters facade

JSC V.V. Tikhomirov Scientific Research Institute of Instrument Design (Russian: ОАО «Научно-исследовательский институт приборостроения имени В.В.Тихомирова», Russian: НИИП, NIIP) is a joint stock company, one of the Russian enterprises in the development of weaponry control systems for fighter planes and mobile medium range anti-aircraft SAM defence vehicles.

== History ==
The institute was created on March 1, 1955 as a branch of the Moscow NII-17 by the Ministry of Aircraft Industry of the USSR Council of Ministers (Resolution N^{o}. 2436-1005, September 18, 1954). In February 1956, the NII-17 branch was reorganized into an independent enterprise known as Scientific Research Institute for Instrumentation, or NIIP. In 1994 the institute was named after his first CEO Viktor Tikhomirov.

At present, NIIP is an enterprise with an industrial and economic infrastructure. The area occupied by the Institute is 42000 square meters.

== Products and developments ==
=== Radar Control Systems ===
- N007 Zaslon complex for MiG-31

=== Medium Range Air Defense Missile Systems ===
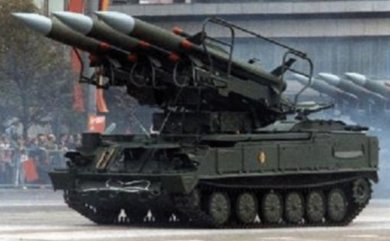
TEL of the 2P25 Kub with missiles erected

- 2K12 Kub missile system with 3M9 missile, 1958-1967 (Kvadrat export version) - NATO codename SA-6 "Gainful"
- Kub-M1 through Kub-M4 modifications
- 9К37 Buk missile system with 9M38 missile - NATO codename SA-11 "Gadfly"
- 9К37М1 Buk-M1 (most common) with 9M38M1 missile
- Ural (unfinished, only prototypes built) - NATO codename SA-17 "Grizzly"
- 9К317 Buk-M2 with 9M317 missile
- 9К37M1-2 Buk-M1-2 (Buk-M1 upgrade for the use of Buk-M2 missile)
- 9К317E Buk-M2E, recent export version of Buk-M2 ADM series featured at 2007 MAKS Airshow
- 9К317M Buk-M3, current version of Buk-M3 ADM series featured at 2013 MAKS Airshow
- ABM-1 Galosh

=== Aircraft Weapon Control Systems ===
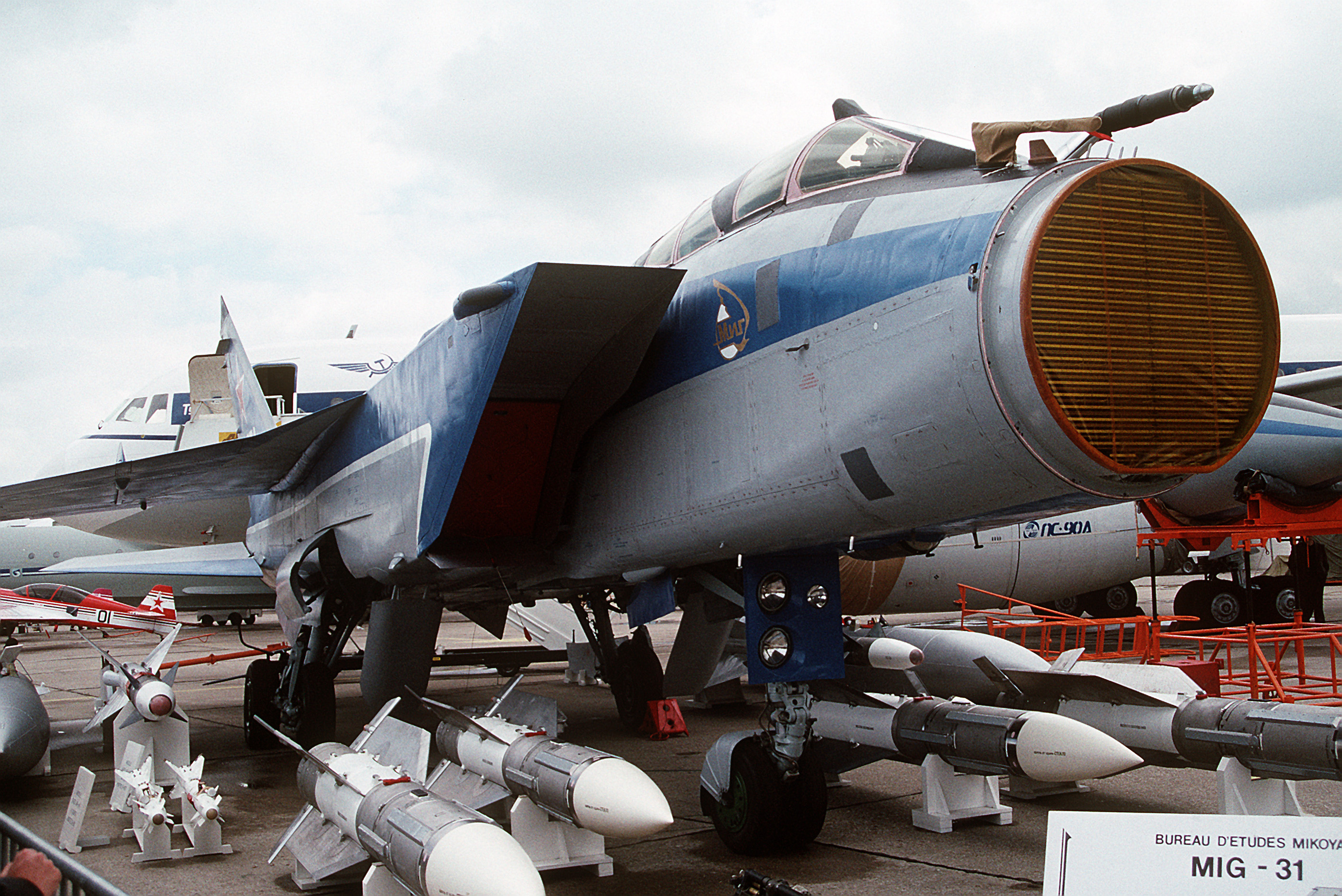
MiG-31 'Foxhound' showing its Zaslon phased-array radar

- MiG-31 AWCS was the first that introduced an electronically scanned phased array antenna (in Soviet Army since 1981)
- SUV-27 (Russian: СУВ-27) AWCS for Su-27 and MiG-29, Su-30, Su-33, Su-35 and their modifications (developing process started in 1978)
- RLSU-27 (Russian: РЛСУ-27) AWCS for Su-27M is a multirole DSP radiolocator based on a slot antenna (developing process started in 1982)
- Radiolocator Targeting Complex Osa - Russian: РЛПК «Оса») - an AWCS for the light fighter jets like MiG-21, MiG-29, MiG-AT

=== Phased Array Antennas ===
- Pero passive phased array with electronic beam scanning
- Bars, Irbis, Byelka a new generation passive phased array antennas
- Epolet-A, an X-band active phased array antenna (currently on a prototype stage)
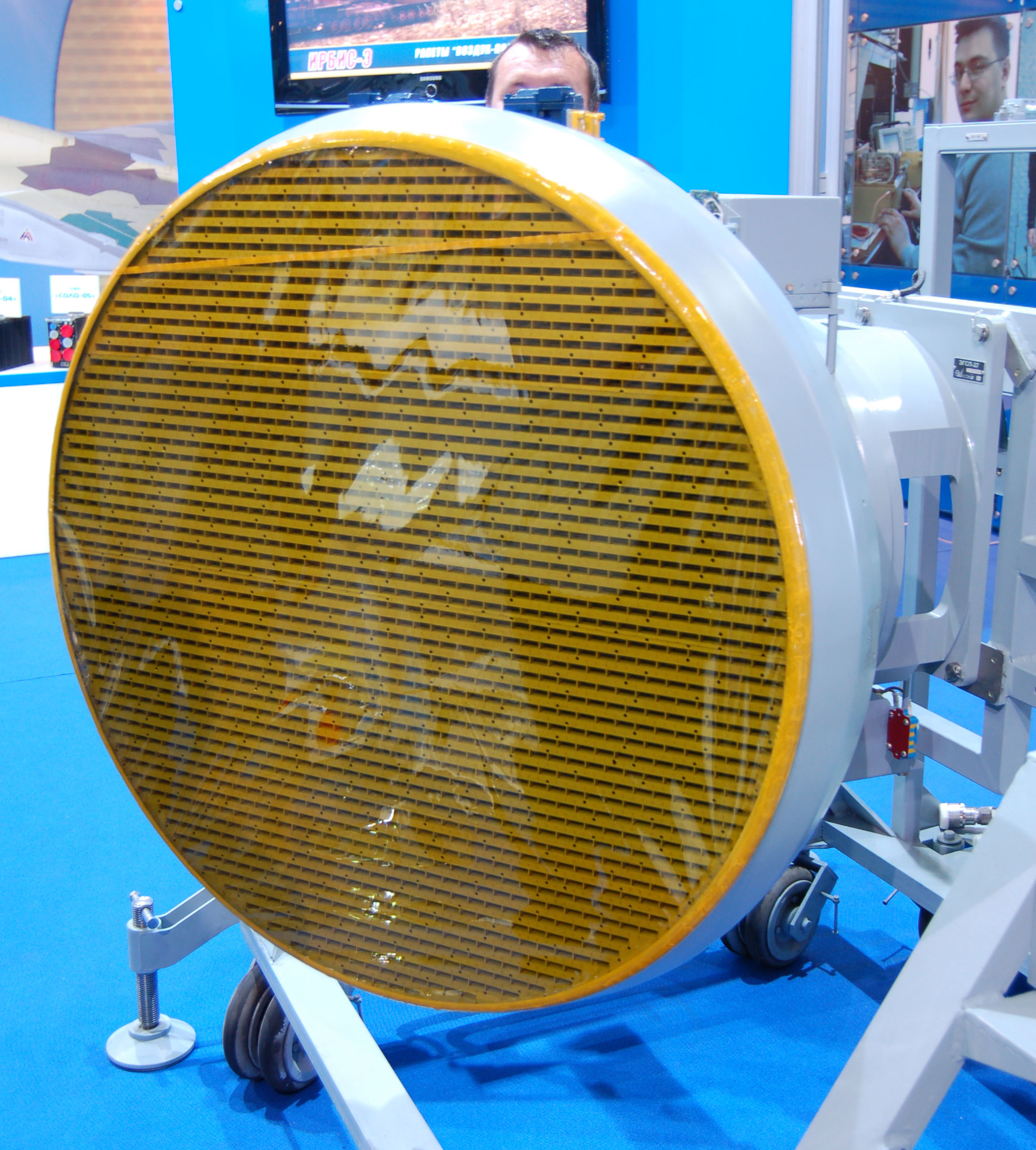
Irbis-E at 2009 MAKS Airshow

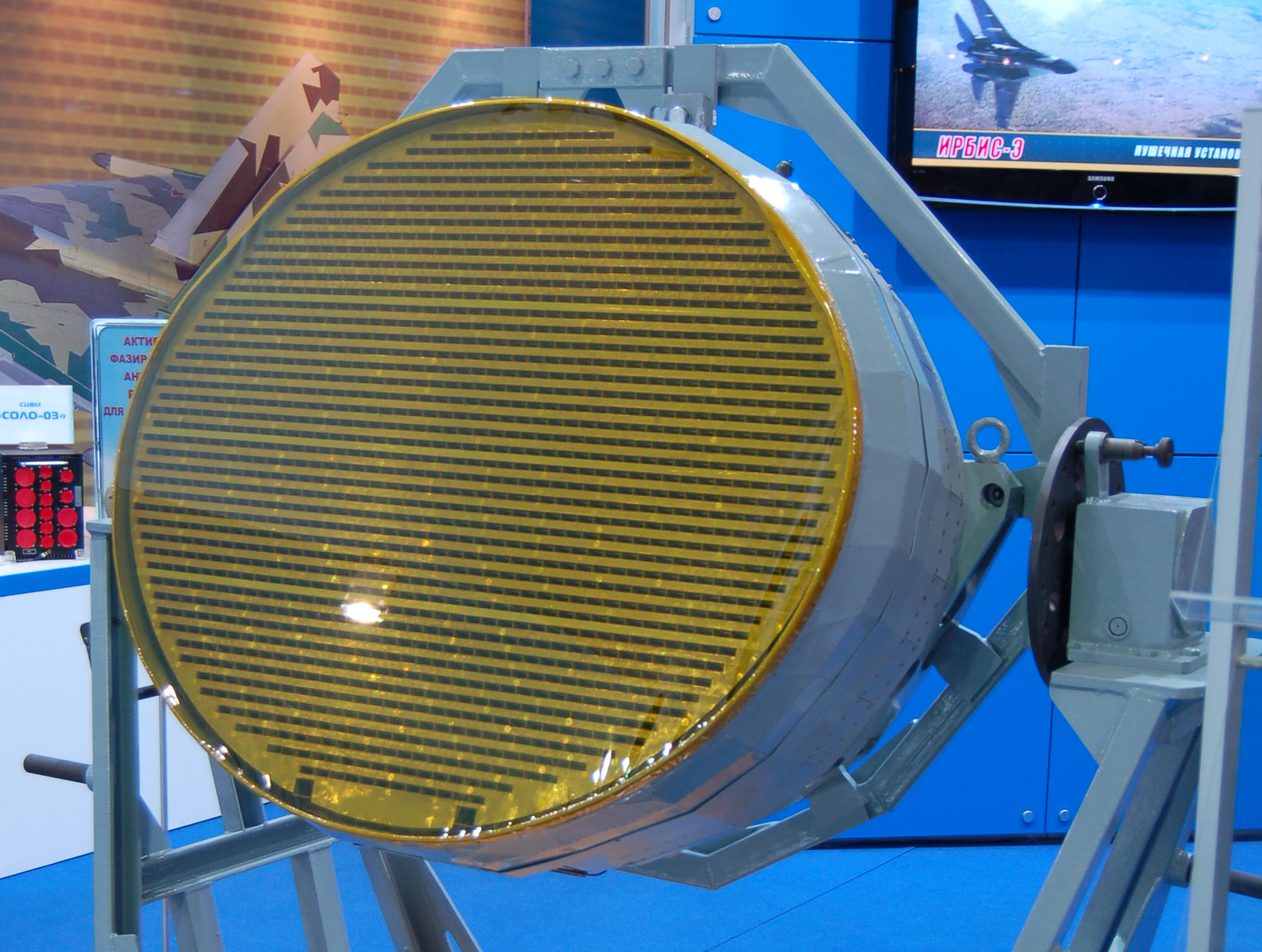
N036 Byelka AESA radar for PAK FA at 2009 MAKS Airshow

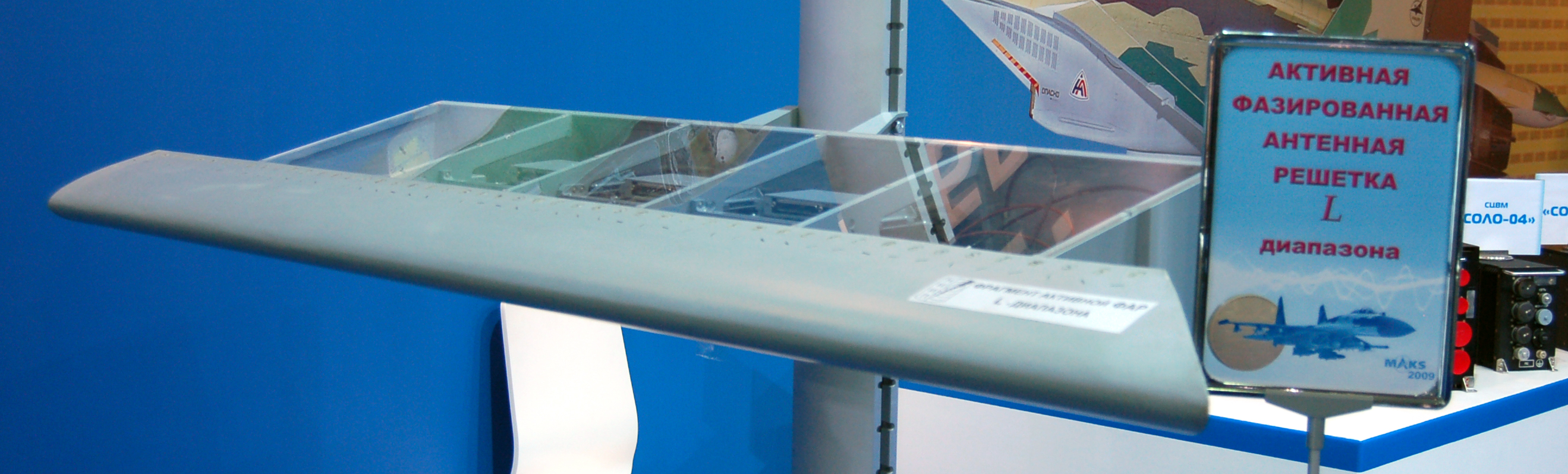
AESA L-band slat radar at 2009 MAKS Airshow

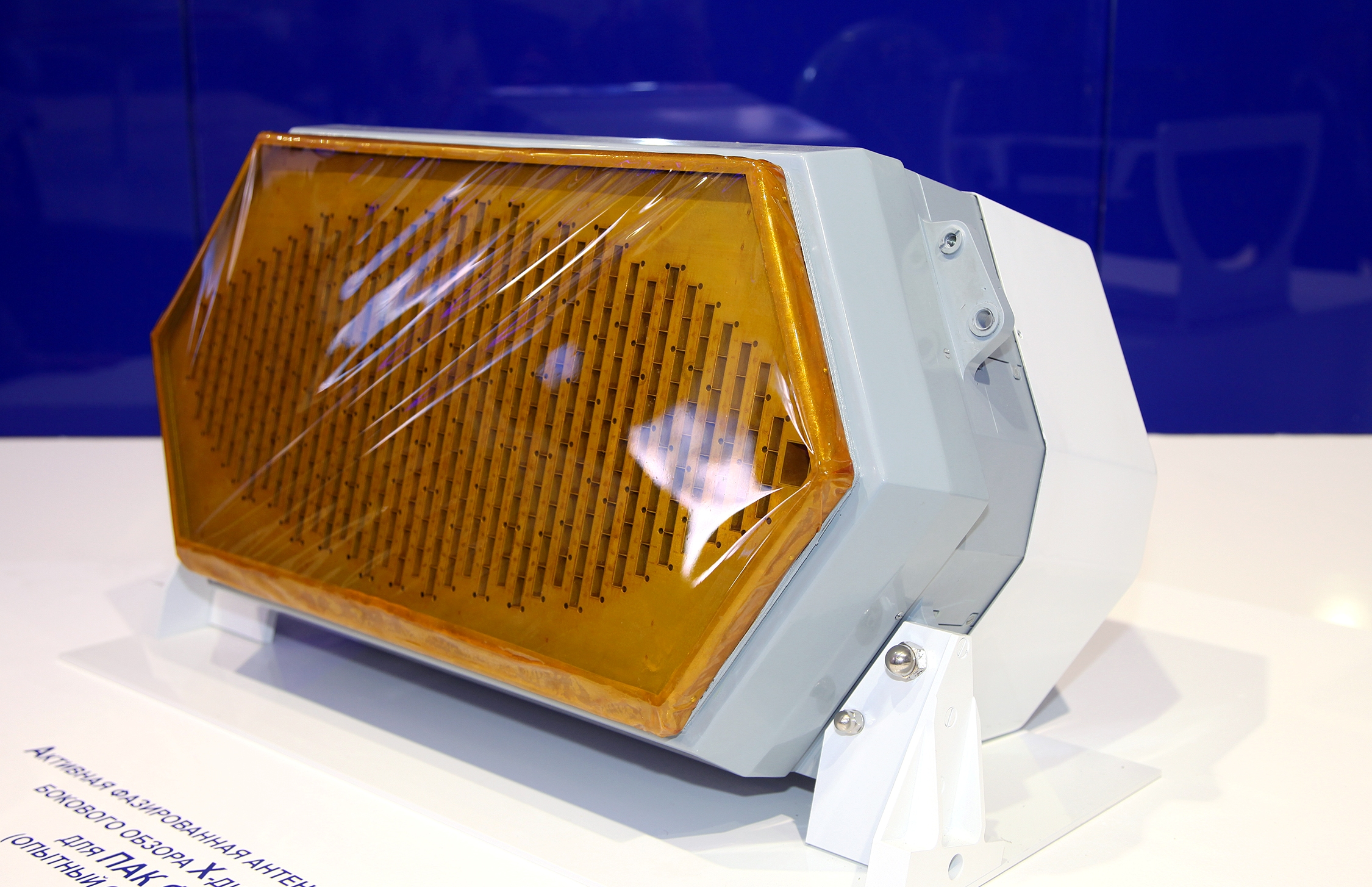
AESA X-band side radar at 2013 MAKS Airshow

=== Radar Seekers ===
- N001 radar

=== Civil Products ===
- an automated control, diagnostics and traffic safety system, universal control panel for Yauza and Rusich underground trains and passenger train cars
- Delta-Geon, a seismic signals registrator
- various OKO geological devices
- an explosives detector for checking baggage and carry-on luggage (capable of detecting substances such as RDX, HMX).
- HYDRA interferometric side-scan sonar

== Notable employees ==
=== Heads of the institute ===
- March 1, 1955 - 1962 - Viktor Vasilievitch Tikhomirov
- 1962-1969 - Yuriy Nikolaevitch Figurovsky, Doctor in Engineering, professor, laureate of the Lenin award, Hero of Socialist Labour
- 1969-1973 - Sergey Afanasievitch Pecherin, laureate of the Lenin Prize and two orders of the Red Banner of Labour;
- 1973-1978 - Viktor Konstantinovitch Grishin, Doctor in Engineering, professor, laureate of the Lenin and State awards, Hero of the Socialist Labour
- 1978-1998 - Valentin Vasilievitch Matyashev, PhD in Engineering, professor, laureate of the Lenin Prize and the USSR State Prize
- since 1998 - Yuriy Ivanovitch Beliy, Honoured Radio Operator, Honoured Aircraft Engineer, member of the Scientific Technical Council of Rosoboronexport

=== Lead researchers and engineers ===
- Ardalion Rastov, designer of both Kub and Buk SAMs
- Eugeny Pigin, chief designer of the institute

== See also ==
- Phazotron-NIIR
- Vega Radio Engineering Corporation
