= Ardalion Rastov =

Soviet engineer, chief designer of surface-to-air missile systems (1926–2012)

- Born: Ardalion Ardalionovich Rastov; 17 June 1926; Moscow, Soviet Union
- Died: 31 July 2012 (aged 86); Moscow, Russia
- Education: Moscow Energy Institute (1949)
- Occupations: Engineer; scientist; chief designer
- Employer: Tikhomirov Scientific Research Institute of Instrument Design (since 1949)
- Notable work: Kub and Buk surface-to-air missile systems

Ardalion Ardalionovich Rastov (Russian: Ардалион Ардалионович Растов; 17 June 1926, Moscow – 31 July 2012, Moscow) was a Soviet engineer and chief designer of Kub and Buk surface-to-air missile systems.

== Biography ==
Rastov studied radio-electronic engineering at Moscow Energy Institute, graduating in 1949. Since 1948 he worked for NII-17 and in 1953 was appointed a deputy to chief designer of Izumrud-2 radar for MiG-17 and MiG-19. Later, in 1955, he was moved to Zhukovsky division of NII-17, currently known as Tikhomirov NIIP, where he directed testing of the K-5 air-to-air missile for MiG-17 and MiG-19.

Since 1957, Rastov worked as a chief designer of Kub missile system (1967—1983) which has successful military service record (more than 500 systems produced). Being for the 16 years a chief designer he made 7 modifications of Kub design. He authored numerous research papers and inventions in aircraft and missile systems.

== Awards and honors ==
- Order of the Red Banner of Labour (1957)
- Order of the October Revolution (1971)
- Lenin Prize (1972)
- USSR State Prize (1980)
- Order of Lenin (1983)
- Hero of Socialist Labour (1983)
