= Passive electronically scanned array =

Type of antenna

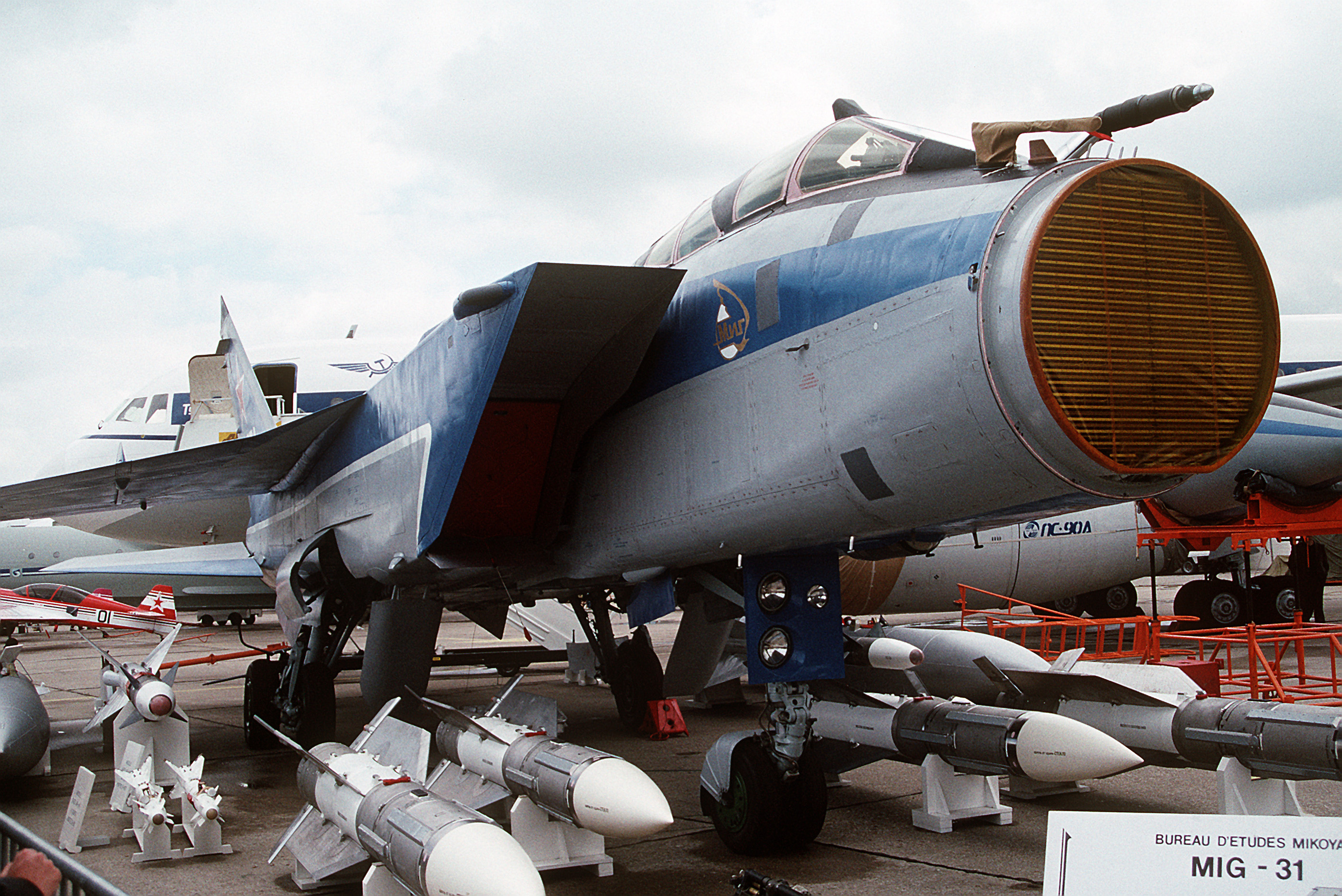
The Mikoyan MiG-31 combat aircraft with nose fairing removed, showing its Zaslon passive electronically scanned array radar antenna.

Animation showing how a passive electronically scanned array works. It consists of an array of antenna elements (A) powered by a single transmitter (TX). The feed current for each antenna passes through a phase shifter (Φ) controlled by a computer (C). The moving red lines show the wavefronts of the radio waves emitted by each element. The individual wavefronts are spherical, but they combine (superpose) in front of the antenna to create a plane wave, a beam of radio waves travelling in a specific direction θ. The phase shifters delay the radio waves progressively going up the line so each antenna emits its wavefront later than the one below it. This causes the resulting plane wave to be directed at an angle θ to the antenna. The computer can alter the phase shifters to steer the beam to a new direction, very quickly. The velocity of the radio waves is shown slowed down enormously.

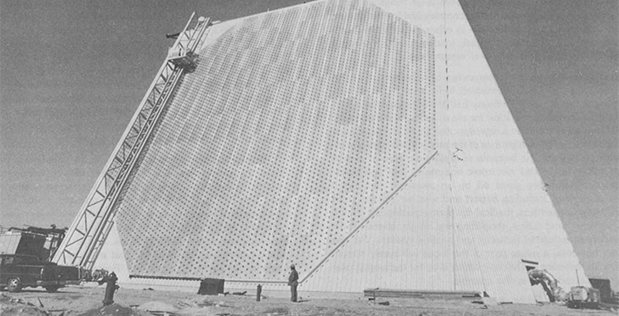
DARPA's experimental two-dimensional Electronically Steered Array Radar

A passive electronically scanned array (PESA), also known as passive phased array, is an antenna in which the beam of radio waves can be electronically steered to point in different directions (that is, a phased array antenna), in which all the antenna elements are connected to a single transmitter (such as a magnetron, a klystron or a travelling wave tube) and/or receiver. The largest use of phased arrays is in radars. Most phased array radars in the world are PESA. The civilian microwave landing system uses PESA transmit-only arrays.

A PESA contrasts with an active electronically scanned array (AESA) antenna, which has a separate transmitter and/or receiver unit for each antenna element, all controlled by a computer; AESA is a more advanced, sophisticated versatile second-generation version of the original PESA phased array technology. Hybrids of the two can also be found, consisting of subarrays that individually resemble PESAs, where each subarray has its own RF front end. Using a hybrid approach, the benefits of AESAs (e.g., multiple independent beams) can be realized at a lower cost compared to true AESAs.

Pulsed radar systems work by connecting an antenna to a powerful radio transmitter to emit a short pulse of signal. The transmitter is then disconnected and the antenna is connected to a sensitive receiver which amplifies any echos from target objects. By measuring the time it takes for the signal to return, the radar receiver can determine the distance to the object. The receiver then sends the resulting output to a display of some sort. The transmitter elements were typically klystron tubes or magnetrons, which are suitable for amplifying or generating a narrow range of frequencies to high power levels. To scan a portion of the sky, a non-PESA radar antenna must be physically moved to point in different directions. In contrast, the beam of a PESA radar can rapidly be changed to point in a different direction, simply by electrically adjusting the phase differences between different elements of the passive electronically scanned array (PESA).

In 1959, DARPA developed an experimental phased array radar called Electronically Steered Array Radar (ESAR). It was a large two-dimensional phased array with beam steering controlled by computers instead of requiring mechanical motion of the antenna. The first module, a linear array, was completed in 1960. It formed the basis of the AN/FPS-85.

Starting in the 1960s, new solid-state devices capable of delaying the transmitter signal in a controlled way were introduced. That led to the first practical large-scale passive electronically scanned array, or simply phased array radar. PESAs took a signal from a single source, split it into hundreds of paths, selectively delayed some of them, and sent them to individual antennas. The radio signals from the separate antennas overlapped in space, and the interference patterns between the individual signals was controlled to reinforce the signal in certain directions, and mute it in all others. The delays could be easily controlled electronically, allowing the beam to be steered very quickly without moving the antenna. A PESA can scan a volume of space much quicker than a traditional mechanical system. Thanks to progress in electronics, PESAs added the ability to produce several active beams, allowing them to continue scanning the sky while at the same time focusing smaller beams on certain targets for tracking or guiding semi-active radar homing missiles. PESAs quickly became widespread on ships and large fixed emplacements in the 1960s, followed by airborne sensors as the electronics shrank.

== List of PESA radars ==
- AN/FPQ-16 PARCS at Cavalier Space Force Station
- AN/MPQ-53
- AN/MPQ-65
- AN/SPQ-11 Cobra Judy
- AN/SPY-1 Aegis combat system
- AN/TPQ-36 and AN/TPQ-37 Firefinder radars
- AN/TPS-75 transportable 3D air search radar
- AN/MPQ-64 Sentinel
- CS/MPQ-90 Bee Eye
- AN/APY-1/2 Boeing E-3 Sentry
- AN/APY-7 for Northrop Grumman E-8 Joint STARS
- AN/APQ-164 B-1B (Northrop Grumman formerly Westinghouse ESG)
- AN/APQ-181 B-2 Spirit (initial version, now AESA)
- ARTHUR
- ARABEL
- EL/M-2026B VSHORAD
- EMPAR
- Saab Giraffe 40/50/75/S/AMB
- Flap Lid and Tomb Stone for the SA-10 and SA-20 systems respectively
- Héraklès
- FuMG 41/42 Mammut radar used by Nazi Germany for early warning against Allied bombers (world's first operational phased array radar)
- Rajendra Radar
- Zaslon, first-ever electronically scanned radar in a fighter jet (MiG-31)
- N035 Irbis (see Sukhoi Su-35BM)
- RBE2 (Rafale)
- NIIP N011M Bars for SU-30MKI
- Leninets V004 (Su-34)
- OPS-12 naval radar
- Hensoldt (EADS) TRML-3D
- Asr, an Iranian PESA
- Multi-function radar of the KM-SAM
- SMART-S Mk2
