= Zaslon =

Russian airborne radar

Zaslon - M
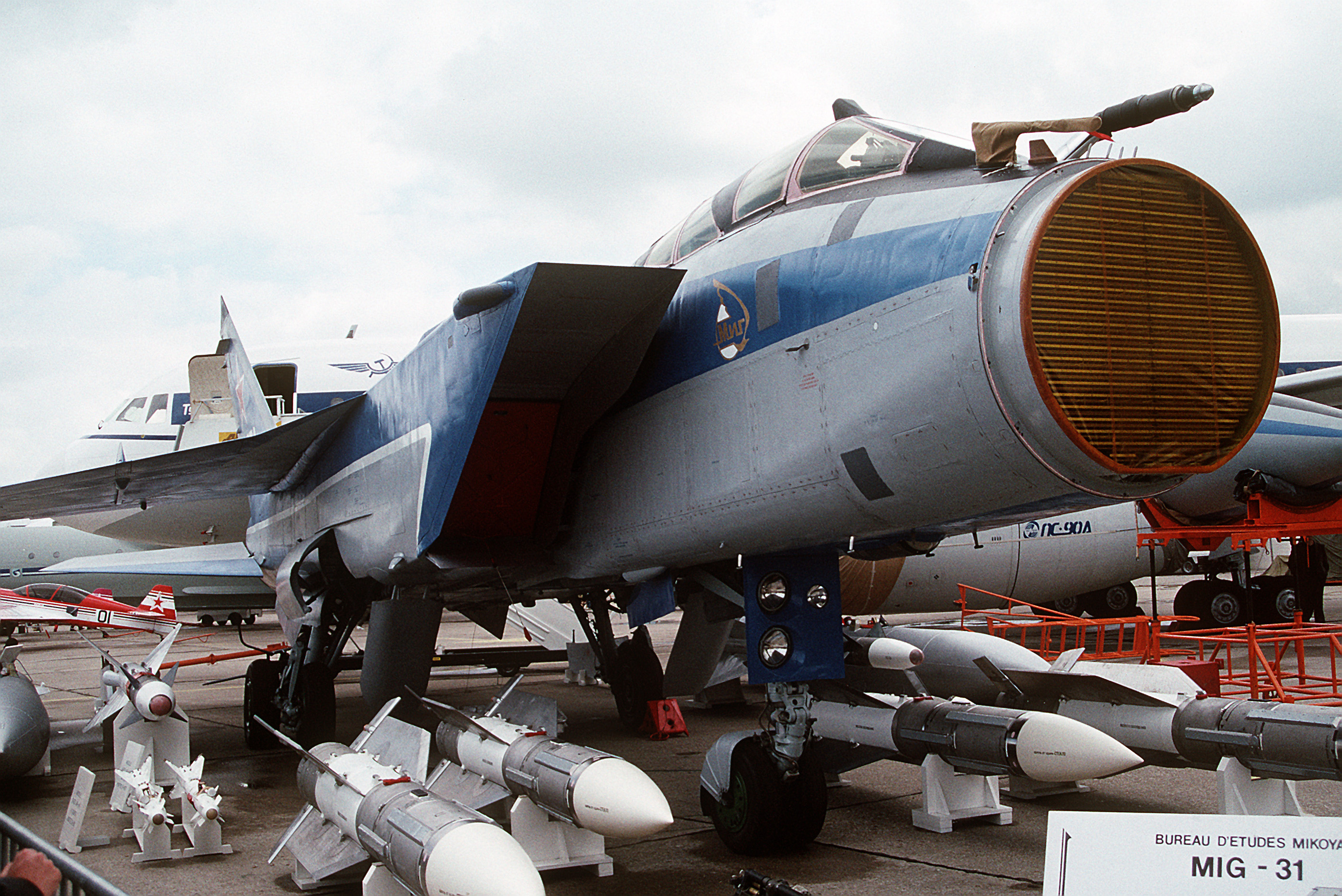
- MiG-31 showing Zaslon antenna
- Country of origin: Russia
- Type: PESA
- Range: 400 km for 20 m^{2} RCS(282 km for 5 m^{2})
- Diameter: 1.4 meters

The BRLS-8B "Zaslon" (Barrier) is a Soviet, and later Russian, all-weather, multimode airborne radar developed between 1975 and 1980 by the Tikhomirov Scientific Research Institute of Instrument Design as part of the weapons control system of the MiG-31 supersonic interceptor. The NATO reporting name for the radar is Flash Dance with the designations "SBI-16", "RP-31", "N007" and "S-800" also being associated with the radar.

== Description ==
The Zaslon is a pulse-Doppler radar with a passive electronically scanned array (PESA) antenna and digital signal processing. The antenna used by the Zaslon is actually a multi-channel system comprising two separate electronically controlled arrays, an X band radar with 1700 emitters and a L band transponder with 64 emitters brought together into a single antenna. The antenna has a diameter of 1.1 meters and is fixed in position with a scanning sector of ±70 degrees in azimuth and +70/−60 degrees in elevation. The X-band components of the radar uses reciprocal ferrite phase shifters that allow the radar to position beams in around 1.2 ms. This high performance is one of the big advantages of phased array radars compared with the previous generation of mechanically scanned arrays which take seconds to perform the same functions as a phased array. The detection performance of the Zaslon radar is stated to be 200 km against a target with a radar cross section (RCS) of 16 m^{2}, the radar can track up to 10 targets while engaging 4 of those at any one time with either R-33 radar guided or R-40, R-60 IR-guided air-to-air missiles. The Zaslon was the Soviet Union's second look-down/shoot-down radar. This made it much harder for United States Air Force aircraft and cruise missiles to penetrate the Soviet airspace at low altitude (through terrain masking/clutter), without being detected.

The radar was a landmark in aviation since it was the first time a PESA radar (previously found only on ground-based systems and the B-1 strategic bomber) had been installed in a jet fighter. The Zaslon radar was publicly unveiled at the 1991 Paris Airshow with its associated MiG-31 interceptor, the Russians even removing the radome of the fighter to allow the Zaslon's revolutionary antenna to be seen. Also at Paris was the US F-117 Nighthawk (revolutionary for its use of stealth technology).

Zaslon uses an Argon-15A computer (first airborne digital computer designed in USSR by Research Institute of Computer Engineering (NICEVT, currently NII Argon).

== Specifications ==
Adopted in 1981 RP-31 N007 backstop (Russian -Zaslon).

- the range of detection of air targets for Zaslon-A: 200 km (for the purpose of a radar cross-section of 19 m^{2} on a collision angle with probability 0.5)
- target detection distance with radar cross-section of 3 m^{2} in the rear within 35 km with a probability of 0.5
- number of detected targets: 24 (was originally 10)
- number of targets for attack: 6 (was originally 4)
- range of automatic tracking: 120 km
- detection of thermal goals: 56 km
- Has great opportunities for the detection of cruise missiles and other targets against the background of the earth's surface

The basic differences between other versions and the MiG-31BM:

The onboard radar complex of the MiG-31BM can track 24 airborne targets at one time, 6 of which can be simultaneously attacked by R-33S missiles.

The MiG-31M, MiG-31D, and MiG-31BM standard aircraft have an upgraded Zaslon-M radar, with larger antenna and greater detection range (said to be 400 km (250 mi) against AWACS-size targets) and the ability to attack multiple targets — air and ground — simultaneously. The Zaslon-M has a 1.4 m diameter (larger) antenna, with 50% to 100% better performance than Zaslon. In April 1994 it was used with an R-37 to hit a target at 300 km distance. It has a search range of 400 km for a 19/20 m^{2} RCS target and can track 24 targets at once, engaging six (282 km for 5 m^{2}). Target speed increased from Mach 5 to Mach 6, improving possibility of firing through the land. The MiG-31 is one of only a few aircraft able to intercept and destroy cruise missiles flying at extremely low heights.

== Variants ==
- Zaslon-A
- Zaslon-M. The development of the modernised MiG-31M in 1983 and later the MiG-31BM interceptors also led to the introduction of an improved Zaslon fire control radar, the Zaslon-M. The Zaslon-M differs from the original Zaslon radar in firstly having a larger antenna, increased to 1.4 meters in diameter and an increased detection range of 400 km for 20 m^{2} RCS. Tracks 24 targets at once, engages 6. In April 1994 used with an R-37 to hit a target at 300 km distance.
- Zaslon-AM, an upgraded version by Leninets and NIIP, Argon-15A replaced with Baget processors

== See also ==
- MiG-31
- List of radars
