= Millerovo =

Millerovo (Russian: Миллерово) is the name of several inhabited localities in Rostov Oblast, Russia.

Urban localities

- Millerovo, Millerovsky District, Rostov Oblast, a town in Millerovsky District

Rural localities

- Millerovo, Kuybyshevsky District, Rostov Oblast, a selo in Krinichno-Lugskoye Rural Settlement of Kuybyshevsky District

Airbase

- Millerovo (air base), Millerovsky District, Rostov Oblast

== See also ==
- Millerovsky (disambiguation)
