= Millerovsky =

Millerovsky (masculine), Millerovskaya (feminine), or Millerovskoye (neuter) may refer to:

- Millerovsky District, a district of Rostov Oblast, Russia
- Millerovskoye Urban Settlement, an administrative division and a municipal formation which the town of Millerovo in Millerovsky District of Rostov Oblast, Russia is incorporated as

== See also ==
- Millerovo
