= Millerovo air base attack =

Missile attack during the 2022 Russian invasion of Ukraine

- Part of the spillover in Western Russia of the 2022 Russian invasion of Ukraine
Date	25 February 2022
Location	Millerovo air base, Millerovo, Rostov Oblast, Russia 48°57′08″N 40°18′08″E

Belligerents
Ukraine	Russia

Units involved
Armed Forces of Ukraine; 19th Missile Brigade	Russian Armed Forces; Russian Air Force; 4th Air and Air Defence Forces Army; 31st Guards Fighter Aviation Regiment

Strength
Several OTR-21 Tochka	Two squadrons of Su-30SM

Casualties and losses
None	One Su-30SM destroyed Several people wounded Ukrainian claim: At least two Su-30SMs destroyed
- Location within Rostov Oblast

On 25 February 2022, the Russian air base in Millerovo, Rostov Oblast, Russia, was attacked by Ukrainian forces during the 2022 Russian invasion of Ukraine. According to some Ukrainian officials, Ukrainian military forces attacked the Millerovo air base with OTR-21 Tochka missiles, destroying Russian Air Force planes and setting the airbase on fire.

== Background ==
Millerovo is a town in Rostov Oblast in Russia, about 60 kilometers from Luhansk, a territory in the Donbas region bordering Russia and partially Russian-rebel held since the beginning of the Russo-Ukrainian War.

== Attack ==
A local law enforcement agency source told local outlet Komsomolskaya Pravda that a Ukrainian Tochka-U missile had hit the facility. Another local outlet, Rostov Gazeta, reported that the attack was carried out by Ukrainian armed formations.

== Analysis ==
Editor-in-chief edition of Ukrainian largest online media Censor.net Yuriy Butusov called the attack "One of the most successful Armed Forces of Ukraine operations in the history of war" and "defeat, which Putin will not be able to hide".

The attack, which the Ukrainian Armed Forces did not officially comment on, was reportedly launched in response to the shelling of Ukrainian cities by Russian forces.

== Aftermath ==
Multiple people were reported to be wounded, and one pilot reportedly died later of his wounds. At least one Sukhoi Su-30SM was destroyed on the ground per tweeted images. However, Ukrainian officials and military experts have claimed that at least two Russian Su-30SM fighters were destroyed on the ground.

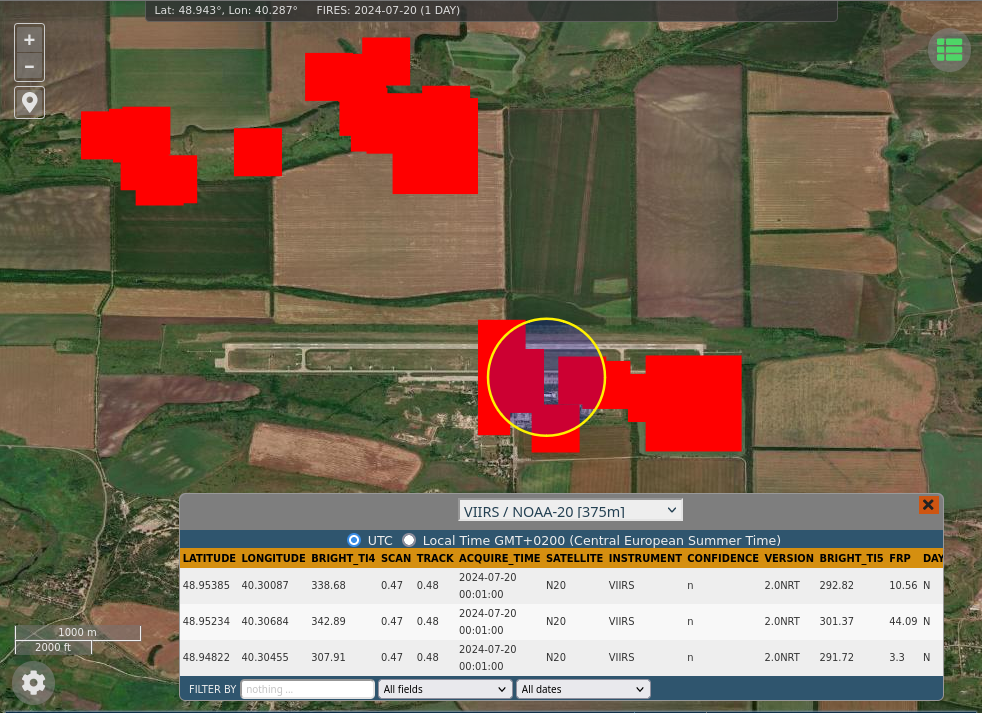
NASA's FIRMS imagery from 20 July 2024 00:01:00 (UTC) showing fires at Millerovo air base

The airfield was bombed again by Ukraine on 20 July 2024 in a drone strike, with several fires seen on the runway by locals.

== See also ==
- Great Raid of 2014
