= Gvardeyskaya Square (Rostov-on-Don) =

Square in Rostov-on-Don, Russia

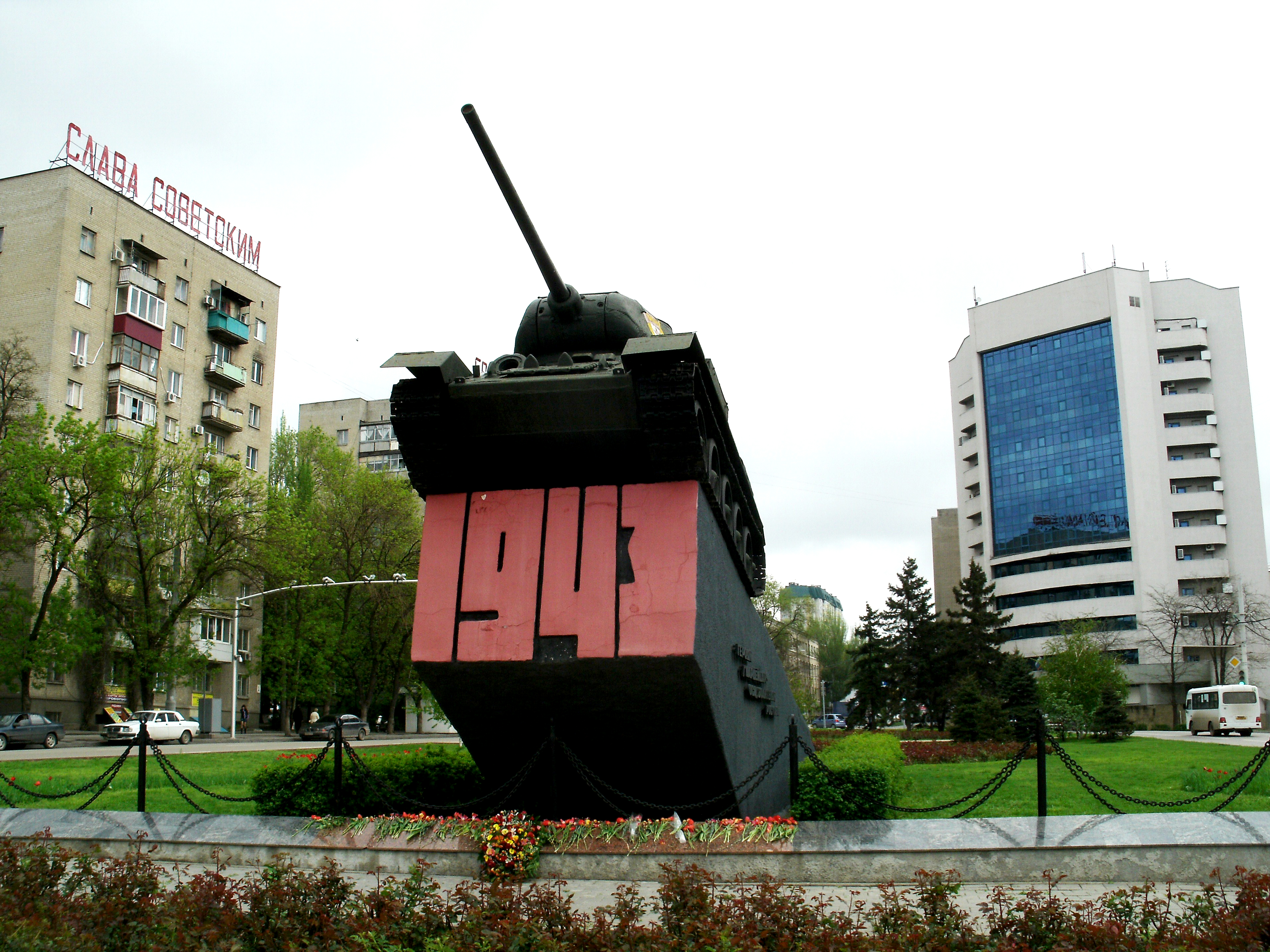
- Interactive map of Gvardeyskaya Square
- Namesake: Guard forces of Red Army
- Location: Rostov-on-Don, Russia
- Coordinates: 47.2238°N 39.6948°E

Gvardeyskaya Square (Russian: Гвардейская площадь) is one of the squares of Rostov-on-Don city, located in Leninsky district in the middle of Krasnoarmeyskaya Street.

== History ==
The square was named in honor of Red Army guards who liberated Rostov-on-Don from Nazi occupation in 1943.

At the center of the square there is a T-34 tank monument erected in honor of soldiers of the 3rd Guards Tank Corps, the 2nd Guards and 5th Guards Zimovnikovsky Mechanized Corps, the 6th Guards Tank Brigade, and the 34th Guards Rifle Division that liberated the city Rostov-on-Don from the Nazi invaders on February 14, 1943. The monument was opened in November 1967, it was built on project of architects G.A. Grigoriev and N.N. Nersesyants.

On pedestal was installed a real combat vehicle which took part in fightings as part of Northern Group of Forces deployed in Poland (the former 6th Tank Brigade). The tank was repaired in Millerovo at a repair plant, from where it came on its own to Rostov-on-Don. In the late 1980s, the monument was repaired, while the combat vehicle again came on its own to the audit and returned.

Around the monument there is a large, grassy area with trees and a flower bed. Every year, on May 9, there is held a solemn meeting and people lay flowers to the monument.
