= Millerovo air base =

Russian Aerospace Forces base in Rostov Oblast

Millerovo
- Millerovo, Rostov Oblast in Russia
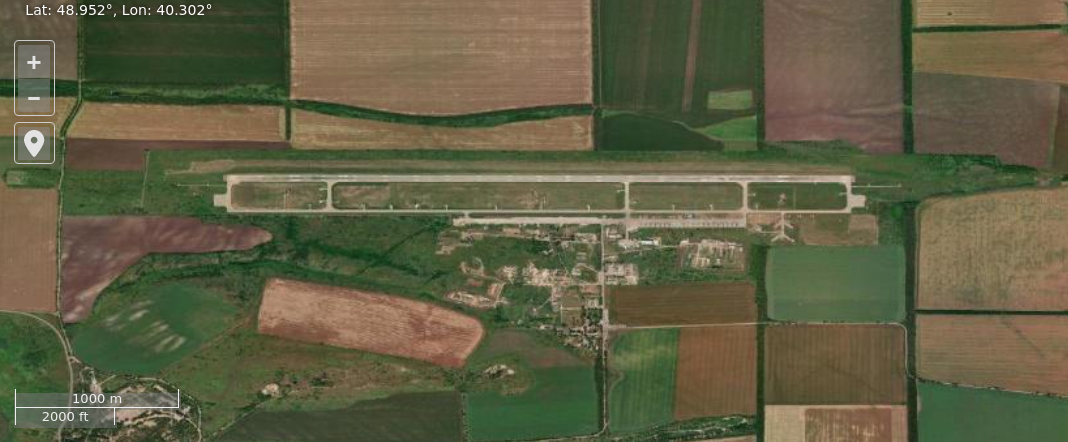
- Satellite imagery of Millerovo air base

Site information
- Type: Air Base
- Owner: Ministry of Defence
- Operator: Russian Aerospace Forces
- Controlled by: 4th Air and Air Defence Forces Army

Location
- Shown within Rostov Oblast, Russia Millerovo (Russia)
- Coordinates: 48°57′08″N 40°18′08″E

Site history
- In use: Unknown - present
- Battles/wars: 2022 Russian invasion of Ukraine

Airfield information
- Elevation: 147 metres (482 ft) AMSL
Runways
Direction	Length and surface
08/26	2,976 metres (9,764 ft) Concrete

Millerovo is an air base in Millerovsky District, Rostov Oblast of the Russian Aerospace Forces as part of the 4th Air and Air Defence Forces Army, Southern Military District.

The base is home to the 31st Guards Fighter Aviation Regiment which has two squadrons of Sukhoi Su-30SM (NATO: Flanker-H) as of 2022.

The 368th Assault Aviation Regiment, with Sukhoi Su-25's (NATO: Frogfoot), also deployed to Millerovo as part of the 2022 Russian invasion of Ukraine.

== History ==
(It was built before 1993)

By 2022, the airbase housed the 31st Guards Fighter Aviation Regiment with two squadrons of Sukhoi Su-30SM (NATO: Flanker-H). and the 368th Assault Aviation Regiment with Sukhoi Su-25's (NATO: Frogfoot).

=== Attacks ===
During the Russian invasion of Ukraine in 2022–24, the airbase has been attacked twice by Ukrainian forces.

On 25 February 2022 reports began circulating, alongside an amateur video showing burning military installations, that Millerovo Airbase had been attacked and damaged by two Tochka-U ballistic missiles launched from Ukraine in response to the Russian invasion of Ukraine and to impede Russian forces from using the airbase to provide air support to Russian troops in Ukraine. There was no subsequent official confirmation from the Ukrainian or Russian armed forces regarding such an attack.

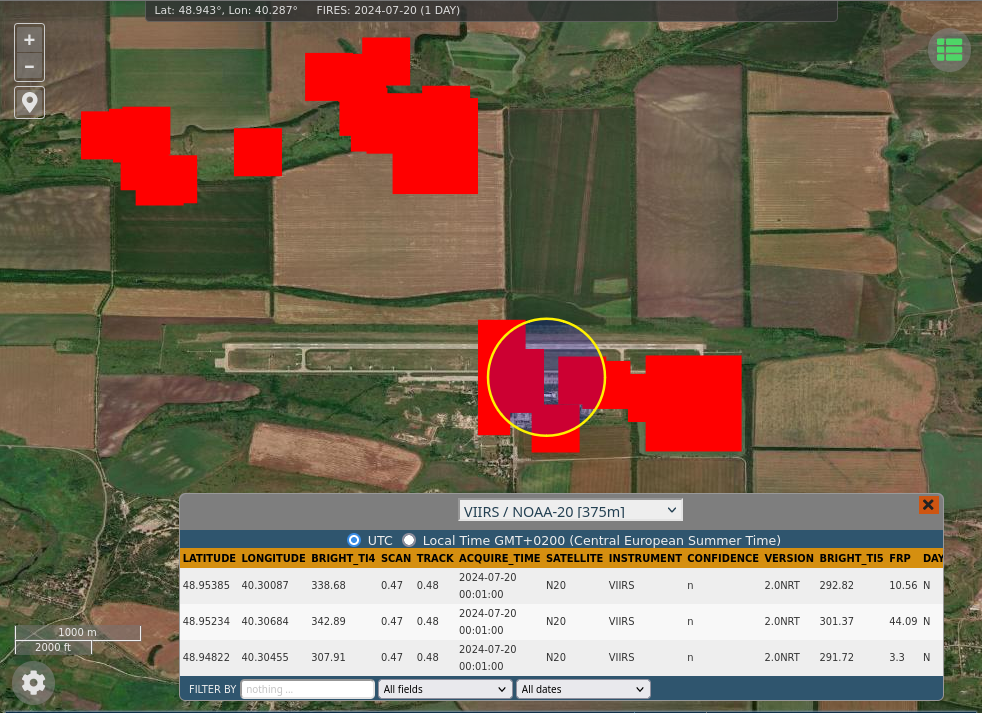
NASA's FIRMS imagery from 20 July 2024 00:01:00 (UTC) showing fires at Millerovo air base

On the night of 19–20 July 2024, the Russian governor of the Rostov Oblast, Vasily Golubev, reported some 26 Ukrainian drones were shot down over the night of 19–20 July with no casualties. Other sources, local social media, quoted locals who reported some sixteen explosions near the air base, fires were reported near the base's "runway and airport apron" as well as a local oil depot.

== See also ==
- List of military airbases in Russia
