= Sukhoi Su-30 =

Russian fighter aircraft

Su-30
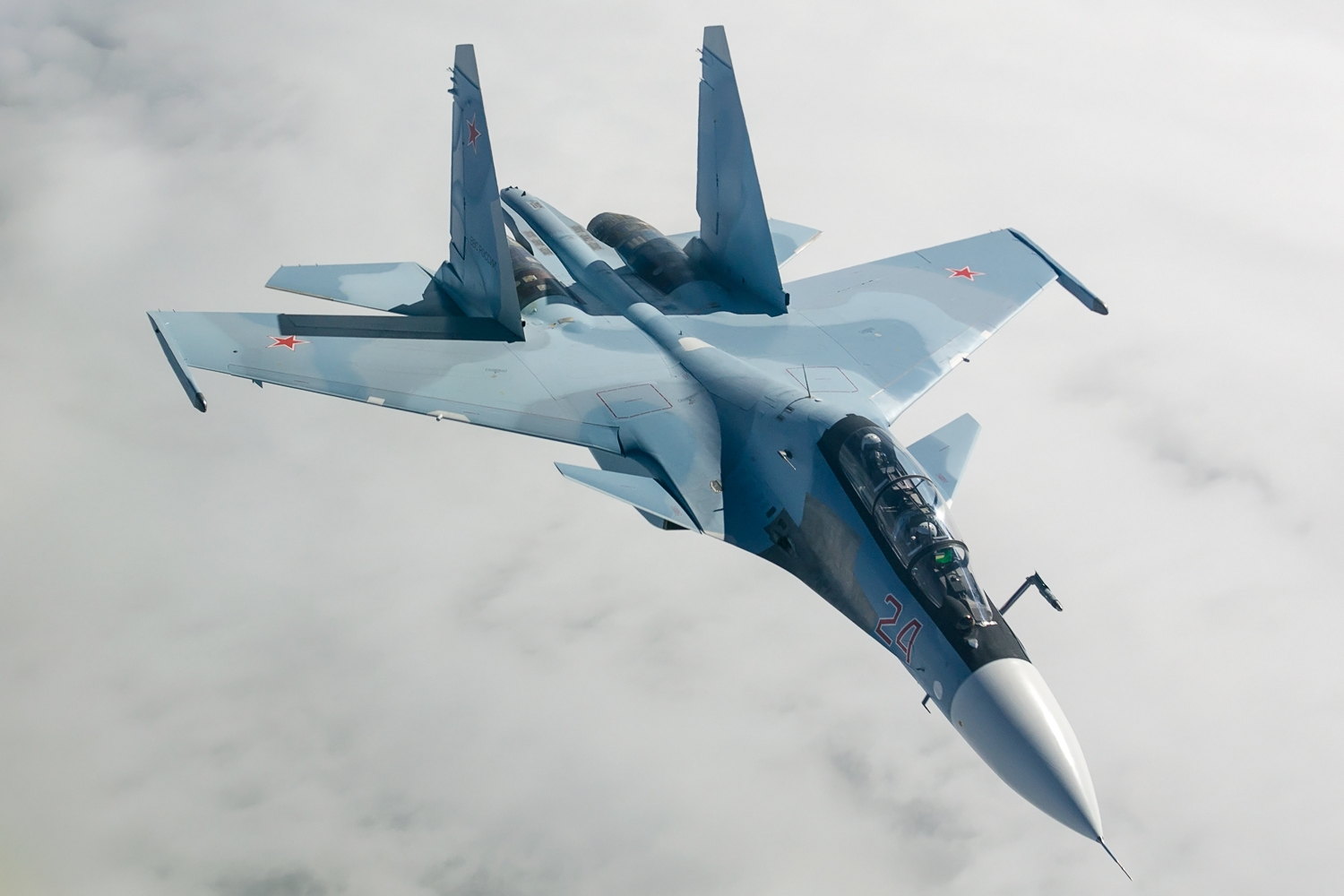
- A Russian Air Force Su-30SM "Flanker-H"

General information
- Type: Multirole fighter
- National origin: Soviet Union; Russia
- Designer: Sukhoi
- Built by: KnAAPO; Irkut Corporation; Hindustan Aeronautics Limited (built by HAL in India under license)
- Status: In service
- Primary users: Russian Aerospace Forces Indian Air Force; People's Liberation Army Air Force; Algerian Air Force
- Number built: 630+ (as of 2019)

History
- Manufactured: 1992–present
- Introduction date: 1992 (Su-30); 2013 (Su-30SM)
- First flight: 31 December 1989; 36 years ago
- Developed from: Sukhoi Su-27
- Variants: Sukhoi Su-30MKI; Sukhoi Su-30MKK; Sukhoi Su-30MKM; Sukhoi Su-30MKA

The Sukhoi Su-30 (Russian: Сухой Су-30; NATO reporting name: Flanker-C/G/H) is a twin-engine, two-seat supermaneuverable fighter aircraft developed in the Soviet Union in the 1980s by Russia's Sukhoi Aviation Corporation. It is a multirole fighter for all-weather, air-to-air interdiction missions. The Russian Aerospace Forces (VKS) were reported to have 130 Su-30SMs in operation as of 2024.

The Su-30 started as an internal development project in the Sukhoi Su-27 family by Sukhoi. From the Su-27UB two-seat trainer, the Su-27PU heavy interceptor was developed. The design plan was revamped and the Su-27PU was renamed to Su-30 by the Russian Defense Ministry in 1996. Of the Flanker family, the Su-27, Su-30, Su-33, Su-34 and Su-35 have been ordered into limited or serial production by the Russian Defense Ministry. Later, different export requirements split the Su-30 into two distinct version branches, manufactured by competing organizations: KnAAPO and the Irkut Corporation, both of which come under the Sukhoi aerospace group's umbrella.

KnAAPO manufactures the Su-30MKK and the Su-30MK2, which were designed for and sold to China, and later Indonesia, Uganda, Venezuela, and Vietnam. Due to KnAAPO's involvement from the early stages of developing the Su-35, these are basically a two-seat version of the mid-1990s Su-35. The Chinese chose an older but lighter radar so the canards could be omitted in return for increased payload. It is a fighter with both air supremacy and attack capabilities, generally similar to the U.S. F-15E Strike Eagle.

Irkut traditionally served the Soviet Air Defense and, in the early years of Flanker development, was responsible for manufacturing the Su-27UB, the two-seat trainer version. When India showed an interest in the Su-30, Irkut offered the multirole Su-30MKI, which originated as the Su-27UB modified with avionics appropriate for fighters. Along with its ground-attack capabilities, the series adds features for the air-superiority role, such as canards, thrust-vectoring, and a long-range phased-array radar. Its derivatives include the Su-30MKM, MKA, and SM for Malaysia, Algeria, and Russia respectively. The VKS operates several Su-30s and has also ordered the Su-30SM variant.

== Development ==
While the original Su-27 had good range, it still did not have enough range for the Soviet Air Defense Forces (PVO, as opposed to VVS – the Soviet Air Force). The Air Defense Forces needed to cover the vast expanse of the Soviet Union. Hence, development began in 1986 on the Su-27PU, an improved-capability variant of the Su-27 capable of serving as a long-range interceptor or airborne command post.

The two-seat Su-27UB combat trainer was selected as the basis for the Su-27PU, because it had the performance of a single-seat Su-27 with seating for two crew members. A "proof-of-concept" demonstrator flew on 6 June 1987, and this led to the kick-off of development work on two Su-27PU prototypes. The first Su-27PU flew at Irkutsk on 31 December 1989, and the first of three pre-production models flew on 14 April 1992.

=== Later development ===
The most extensive ongoing modernization effort for the Su-30 family is the Indian Air Force's (IAF) "Super Sukhoi" program, a comprehensive mid-life upgrade for approximately 80 to 84 of its Su-30MKI fighters.The plan aims to add an active electronically scanned array (AESA) radar and also aims to improve the cockpit systems alongside the uprated avionics, and EW suites.The project also includes the Su-30MKI to be compatible with India's Indigenously developed missiles BrahMos and Astra missiles. The project also aims to improve suppression or destruction of enemy air defences (SEAD/DEAD) and attacking ground targets in heavily defended areas. The upgrades aims the jet to remain in service until 2055.

The project is estimated to cost around ₹66,829 crore (US$7.9 billion). The upgrade will be carried out by Hindustan Aeronautics Limited (HAL) and Defence Research and Development Organisation (DRDO).The Indian Air Force has initiated pilot projects with the Indian Institute of Technology (IIT) Bombay to develop and implement AI-driven solutions for the Su-30MKI fleet.

== Design ==
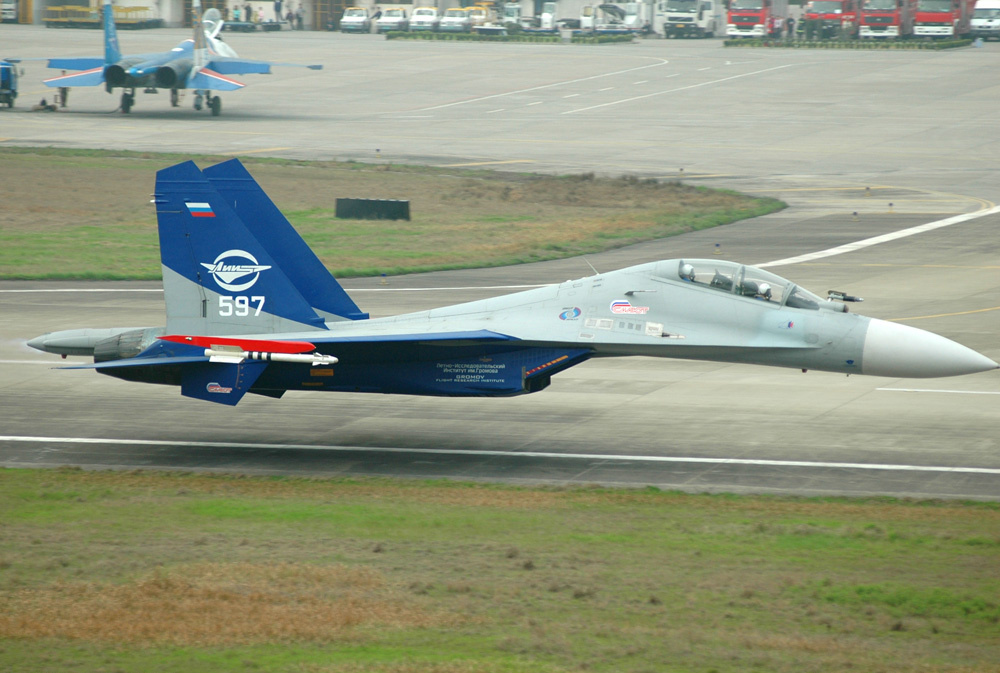
Russian Air Force Sukhoi Su-30LL flying along the runway at Zhangjiajie Hehua Airport extremely close to the ground piloted by Anatoly Kvochur.

The Su-30 is a multirole fighter. It has a two-seat cockpit with an airbrake behind the canopy. It can serve as an air superiority fighter and as a strike fighter.

=== Flight characteristics ===
The integrated aerodynamic configuration, combined with the thrust vectoring control ability, results in high maneuverability and supermaneuverability characteristics. Equipped with a digital fly-by-wire system, the Su-30 can perform some very advanced maneuvers, including the Pugachev's Cobra and the tailslide. These maneuvers quickly decelerate the aircraft, causing a pursuing fighter to overshoot, as for breaking a Doppler radar lock, as the relative speed of the aircraft drops below the threshold where the signal registers to the radar.

Some variants of the Su-30, notably the Su-30MKI and its derivatives including the Su-30MKM and Su-30SM, are fitted with canards to enhance maneuverability and also compensate for the heavier N011M Bars radar and mission systems in the nose. The canards and the reshaped leading-edge extensions (LERX) help control the vortices and increase the angle-of-attack limit of the airframe, but they also add drag and reduce the maximum speed to Mach 1.75.

=== Powerplant ===
As with the baseline Su-27S/P, the Su-30's powerplant incorporates two Saturn AL-31F afterburning low-bypass turbofan engines, fed through intake ramps. Two AL-31Fs, each rated at 122.6 kN (27,600 lbf) of full afterburning thrust for speeds up to Mach 2 in level flight and 1,350 km/h speed at low altitude for non-canard variants. Canted thrust vectoring is used in some variants to enhance maneuverability.

With a normal fuel reserve of 5,270 kg, the Su-30MK is capable of performing a 4.5-hour combat mission with a range of 3,000 km. An aerial refuelling system increases the range to 5,200 km (3,200 mi) or flight duration up to 10 hours at cruise altitudes.

=== Avionics ===
The aircraft features autopilot ability at all flight stages including low-altitude flight in terrain-following radar mode, and individual and group combat employment against air and ground/sea-surface targets. Automatic control system interconnected with the navigation system ensures route flight, target approach, recovery to airfield and landing approach in automatic mode.

Some of the at least $783,000 that Irkut-Yakovlev sourced from Thales in 2022 was for their holographic Head-Up Display 3022 system.

=== Maintenance ===
The sanctions policy created as a result of the 2022 Russian invasion of Ukraine caused problems with aftermarket sales and servicing of the French systems that have become an integral part of the Su-30SM. The VKS now needs, via its Rosaviaspetskomplekt partner, to have its warplanes maintained by the Kazakhstani firm ARC Group which is the "exclusive distributor of Safran Electronics & Defence in the Republic of Kazakhstan".

== Operational history ==
=== Russia ===
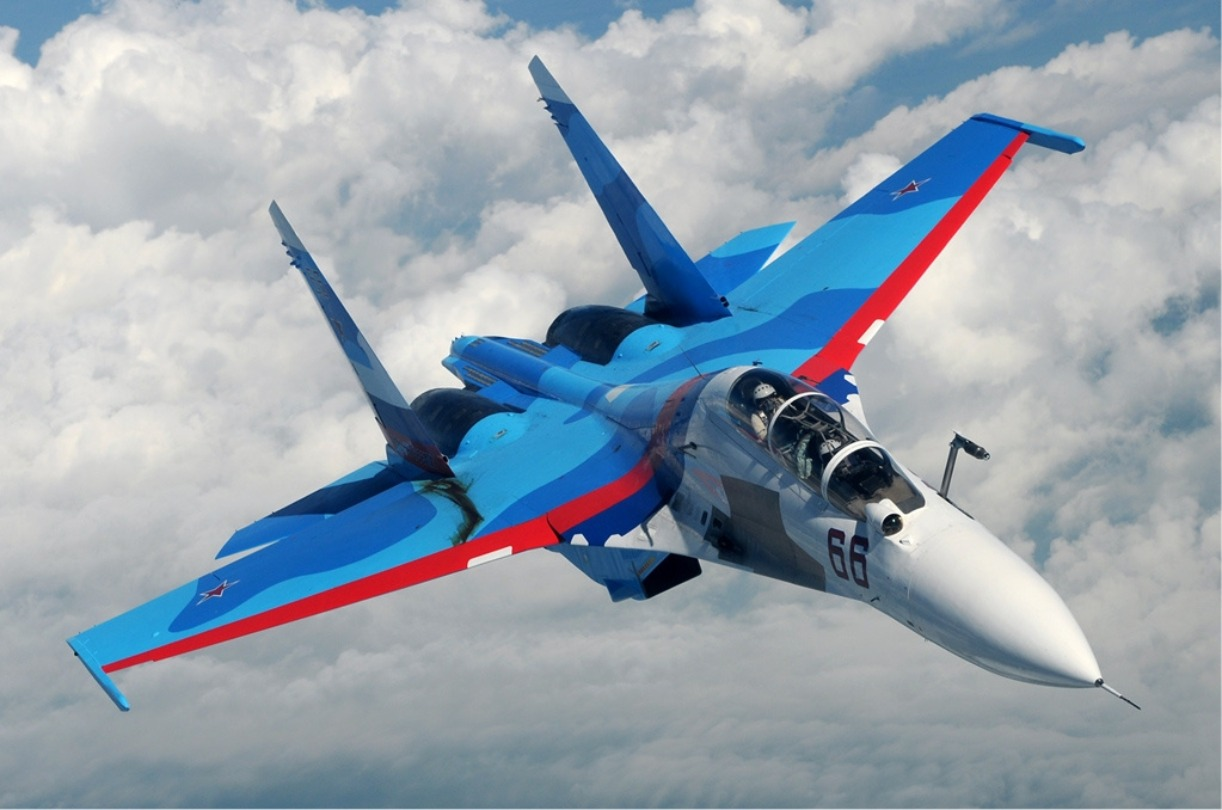
Russian Air Force Su-30 from the Russian Falcons Aerobatic Team

In 1994–1996, an initial batch of five original Su-30 (Su-27PU) fighters, contracted for the Russian Defence Ministry, were delivered to 54th Guards Fighter Aviation Regiment based at Savasleyka air base. No further orders of the variant were made. However, the Russian Defence Ministry was impressed with the export Su-30MKI's performance envelope and ordered a local version of the same aircraft for their own use, called the Su-30SM, which is the third adaptation of the MKI after the Malaysian Su-30MKM and the Algerian MKA. A total of 60 Su-30SM fighters, under two contracts signed in March and December 2012, respectively. On 21 September 2012, the Su-30SM performed its maiden flight. The Russian Air Force has received first two serial aircraft on 22 November 2012. By end of 2015, 31st Fighter Aviation Regiment, the last aviation regiment of the Russian Aerospace Forces that operated Soviet-made MiG-29A/UBs (izdeliye 9.12/9.13) was fully rearmed with about twenty new Su-30SM fighters. All aircraft of the first two contracts were delivered by 2016.

Another 36 aircraft were ordered in April 2016, six of which intended for the Russian Naval Aviation. This was to increase the total number to 116 (88 in the Air Force and 28 in the Navy).

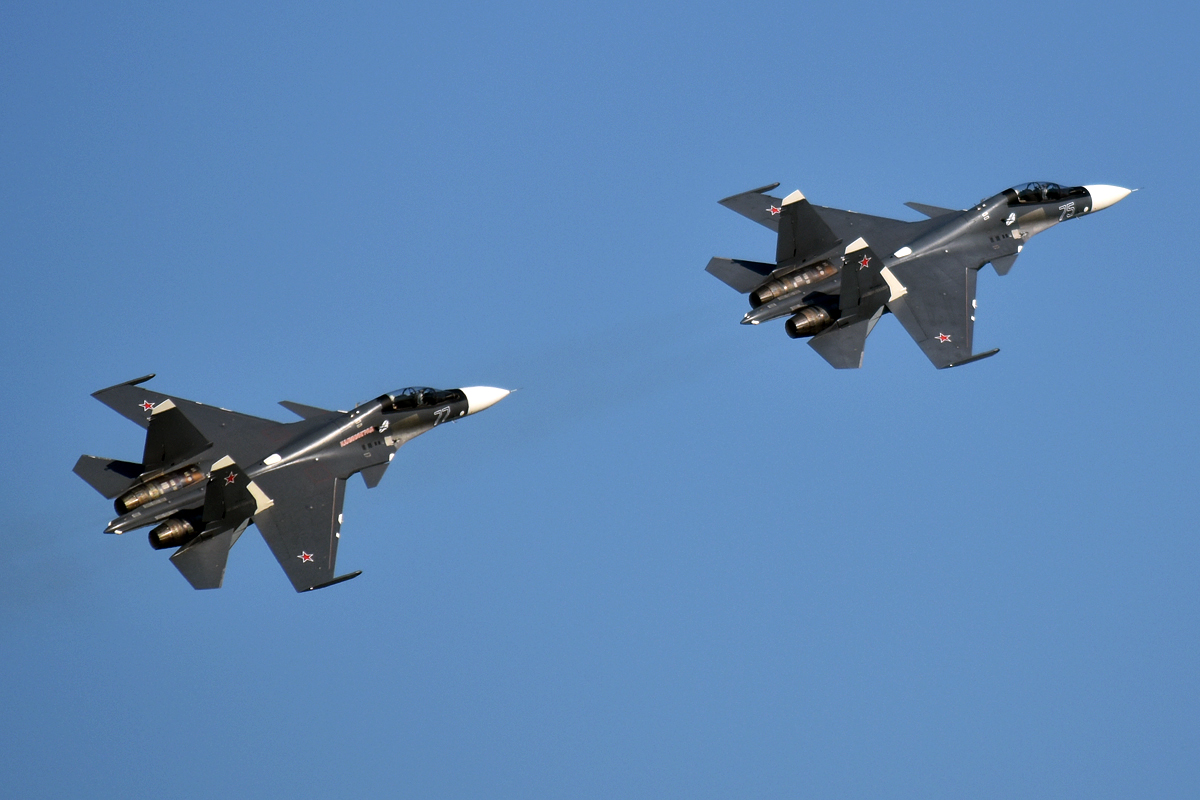
A pair of Russian Naval Aviation Su-30SMs

On 25 August 2020, a contract for 21 modernized Su-30SM2 aircraft for the Russian Naval Aviation was signed at the 'ARMY-2020' military-technical forum.

==== 2015 Russian military intervention in Syria ====
In September 2015, Russia deployed Su-30SM fighters for the first time to Latakia International Airport, Syria. At least four Su-30SM fighters were spotted in a satellite photo. In late December 2015, there were 16 Su-30SMs at Khmeimim Air Base. As part of their combat deployment, they provided target illumination for bombers launching airstrikes against rebel groups.

Su-30SMs were initially tasked with aerial escort of Russian attack jets and strategic bombers but also conducted air to ground duties. On 21 March 2017, rebel forces launched a new offensive in the Hama province; a few days later a video emerged showing a Russian Aerospace Forces Su-30SM striking ground targets with unguided air-to-ground rockets in a dive attack against the rebels.

On 3 May 2018, a Russian Aerospace Forces Su-30 crashed shortly after take-off from the Khmeimim Air Base, killing both crew members.

==== Russo-Ukrainian war ====
Russian Su-30SM and Su-35s fighters were used for air superiority missions during the war. Combined, at least seven air to air victories were confirmed over Ukrainian jet aircraft and one over a Ukrainian Naval Aviation Mil Mi-14.

A Russian Su-30 was destroyed on the ground by Ukrainian OTR-21 Tochka missiles fired during the Millerovo air base attack.

On 5 March 2022 a Russian Naval Aviation Su-30SM, RF-33787, tail number Blue 45 was shot down in Bashtanka area, Mykolayiv Oblast. Both crew members, Major Aleksey Golovensky and Captain Aleksey Kozlov, were captured. The same day another Su-30 was lost in Ochakov, Mykolaiv Oblast, pilot by Lt. Colonel Aleksey Khasanov and Cpt Vasily Gorgulenko were killed while on combat duty in Ukraine.

On 13 March 2022, another aircraft, RF-81733, tail number Red 72, was lost over Ukraine; the pilot, Kosyk Serhiy Serhiyovych, survived and was captured.

On 15 March 2022, a Su-30SM, serial number RF-81773 tail number Red 62, was shot down near Izium, Kharkiv. Pilots Alexander Pazynych and Evgeny Kislyakov, did not survive and Capt. Aleksander Pozinich from 14th Guards Fighter Aviation Regiment, were killed.

On 9 August 2022, explosions at Saky air base in Novofedorivka, Crimea left at least three Su-30s destroyed and one damaged according to satellite imagery. On 18 August a Su-30SM, serial number RF-81771, had its wreckage recorded in Kharkiv region in the Izyum direction.

On 18 August 2022, remains of a Russian Su-30 registration number RF-81771 tail number Red 60, were discovered near Mala Komyshuvakha, Izium. The fate of the pilots remained unknown.

On 27 August 2023, Ukrainian media, citing claims made by the Security Service of Ukraine, said that 16 Sypaq Corvo Precision Payload Delivery System drones had been used in an attack on the Kursk Vostochny Airport in Russia, with three shot down and the others hitting four Su-30s and one MiG-29 aircraft. An S-300 radar and two Pantsir air defence systems were also reportedly hit.

On 12 August 2024 a Ukrainian Air Force MiG-29, callsign 72 White, piloted by Olexander Migulya was shot down in a combat mission by a Russian Su-30.

On 2 February 2025, a Ukrainian Air Force Sukhoi Su-27 was shot down in the area of Pokrovsk, Donetsk Oblast. Russian sources claimed it was shot down by an R-37M missile fired from a Su-30SM2. The pilot, kapitan Ivan Bolotov of the 831st Tactical Aviation Brigade, did not survive.

On 2 May 2025, a Ukrainian HUR Magura V7 naval drone shot down a Russian Su-30 using an AIM-9X missile, 50 km west of Novorossiysk. The crew of two ended up in the Black Sea, where a civilian ship later recovered them. HUR claimed it was the first time a maritime drone shot down an aircraft.

=== India ===
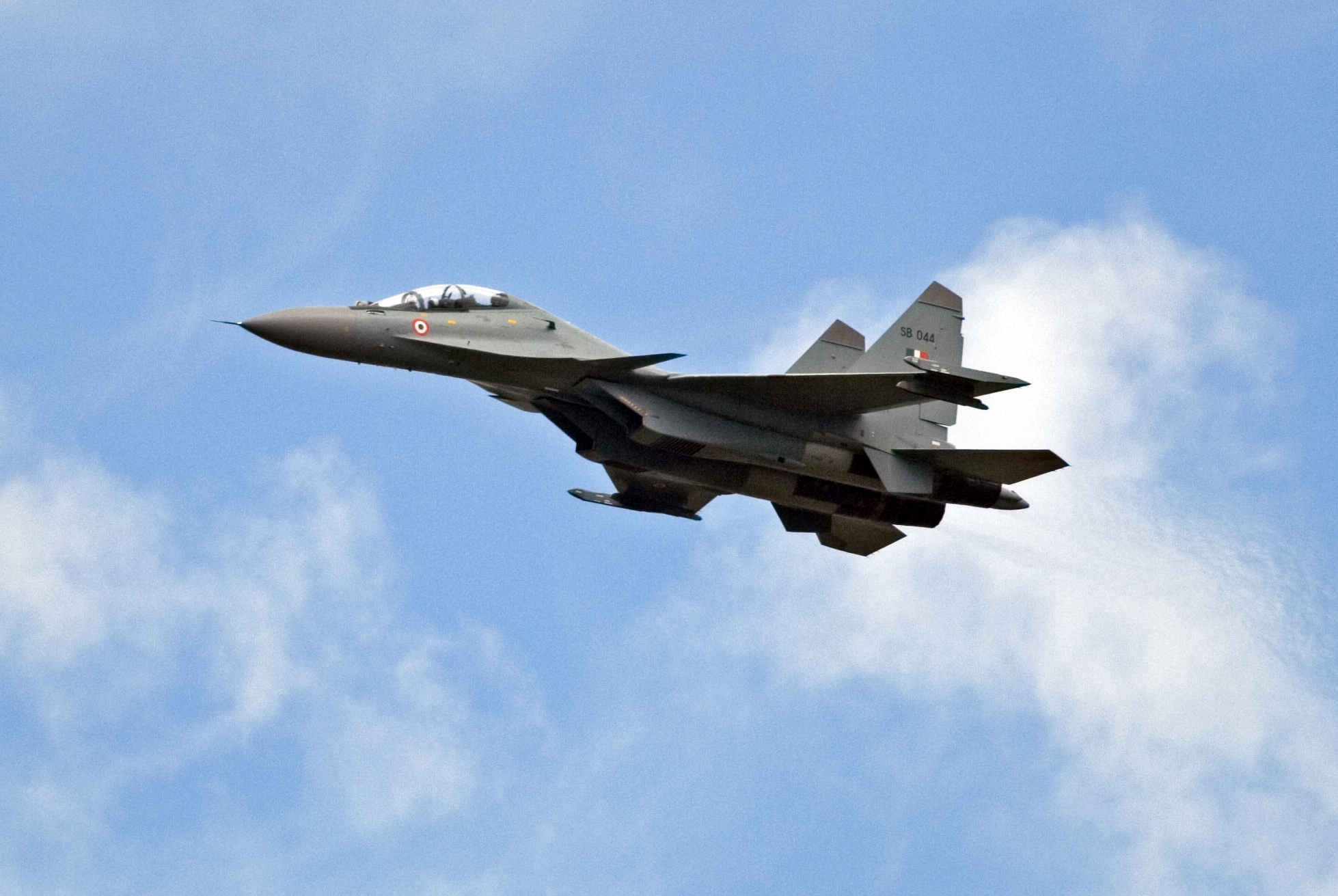
Indian Air Force Su-30MKI

First talks about acquiring of new fighter for the Indian Air Force began in 1994. A year later, the Sukhoi Design Bureau started working on the new fighter based on the original Su-30 design, which later evolved into Su-30MK (Modernizirovannyi Kommercheskiy - Modernized Commercial) and ultimately into Su-30MKI (Modernizirovannyi Kommercheskiy Indiski - Modernized Commercial Indian). On 30 November 1996, Russian state company Rosvooruzhenie (now Rosoboronexport) and Indian Defense Ministry signed a contract for development and production of eight Su-30Ks and 32 Su-30MKIs for the Indian Air Force. In March–July 1997, all eight Su-30Ks of the order were delivered at Lohegaon Air Force Base in India. On 28 December 2000, as part of the Russian-Indian cooperation, a contract worth more than US$3 billion was signed for license production of 140 Su-30MKI fighters at Hindustan Aeronautics Limited (HAL) production plant in Nashik. Between 2002 and 2004, in accordance with the 1996 contract, 32 Su-30MKIs were built by Irkutsk Aviation Plant for the Indian Air Force. From 2004 onwards, production is carried by HAL.

In 2007, India and Russia agreed to a deal for another 40 Su-30MKIs for US$1.6 billion, to be produced in India under license. In March 2010, it was reported India and Russia were negotiating a contract for additional 42 aircraft. India was also considering acquisition of 12 more fighters to compensate for Su-30 losses over nearly 20 years of operation. In 2020, due to the 2020–2021 China–India skirmishes, India determined to purchase 12 additional Su-30MKIs.

In 2024, Indian media reported negotiations between HAL and Russia for exporting Indian-produced Su-30MKIs. This may be to circumvent American economic sanctions on the export of Russian weapons and their technology.

==== 2025 India-Pakistan conflict ====
India launched Operation Sindoor in the early hours of 7 May 2025, targeting nine alleged terror camps across Pakistan and Pakistan-administered Kashmir in response to the Pahalgam attack. The Pakistan Air Force claimed to have shot down one of the Su-30MKIs of the Indian Air Force, over Akhnoor during the mission.

=== China ===
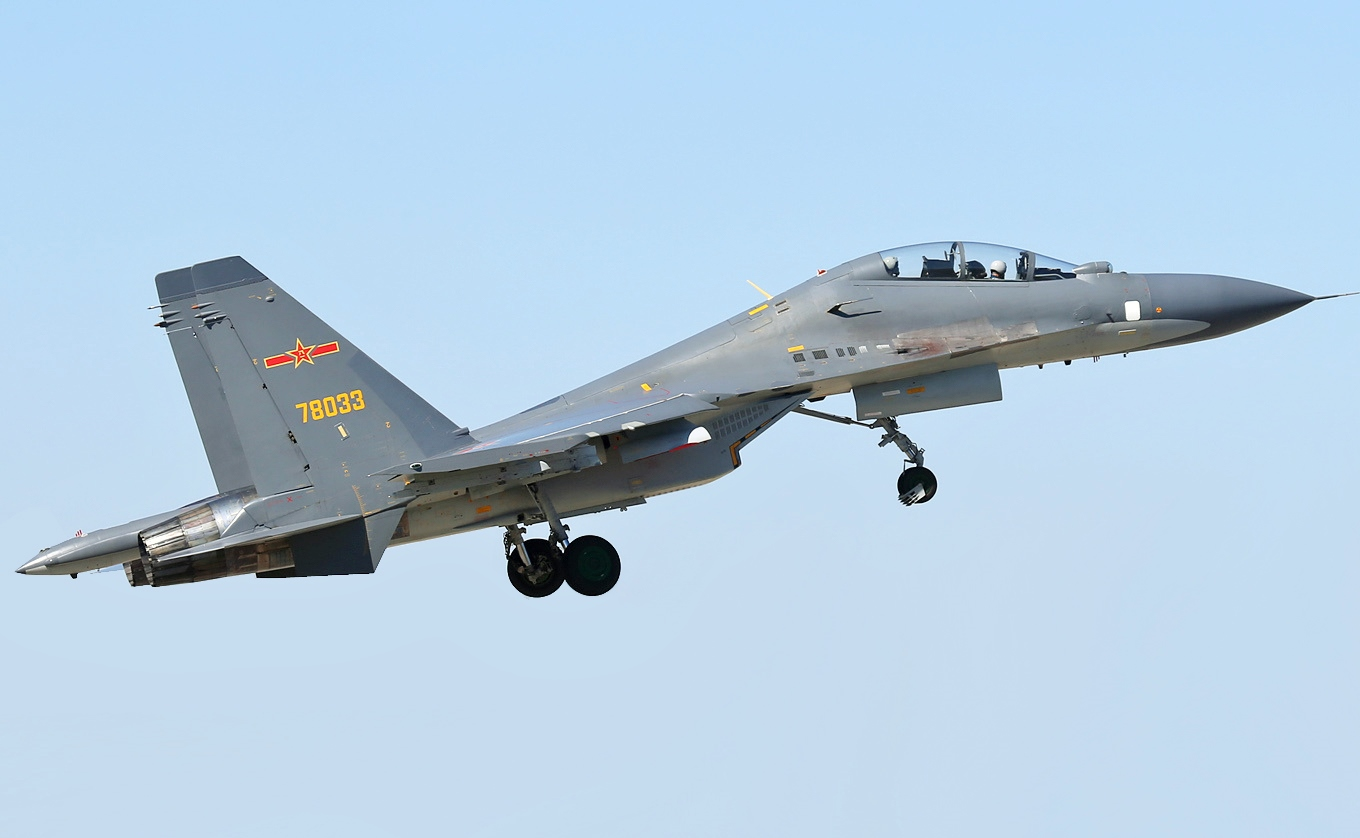
A PLAAF Sukhoi Su-30MKK at Lipetsk

To better counter USAF's expanding capabilities in the region, in 1996, an agreement worth US$1.8 billion was reached with Russia to purchase some 38 multirole combat aircraft based on the original Su-30 design. Taking into account China's requirements for its new fighter, the aircraft became known as Su-30MKK (Modernizirovannyi Kommercheskiy Kitayski - Modernized Commercial Chinese).

In March 1999, first prototype took off from Gromov Flight Research Institute in Russia and a year later it appeared at Zhuhai Air Show in China. People's Liberation Army Air Force (PLAAF) has received first batch of ten Su-30MKK fighters in December 2000, following by second and third batches of ten fighters in August and December 2001, respectively. In July 2001, China has ordered 38 more Su-30MKK fighters.

A modified variant, known as "Su-30MK2", was negotiated for the People's Liberation Army Naval Air Force (PLANAF) in 2002, with contract for 24 aircraft signed in 2003. All the aircraft were delivered to PLANAF in 2004.

=== Myanmar ===
The Myanmar Air Force ordered six Su-30SMEs in 2018. 2 Su-30SMEs delivered in March 2022 and entered service on 15 December. Between 4 and 6 have arrived as of November 2022. 4 delivered as of 15 December 2023. Another 2 Su-30 SME had been received on 15 December 2024. The Myanmar Air Force has between 8 and 10 Su-30SMEs.

=== Malaysia ===
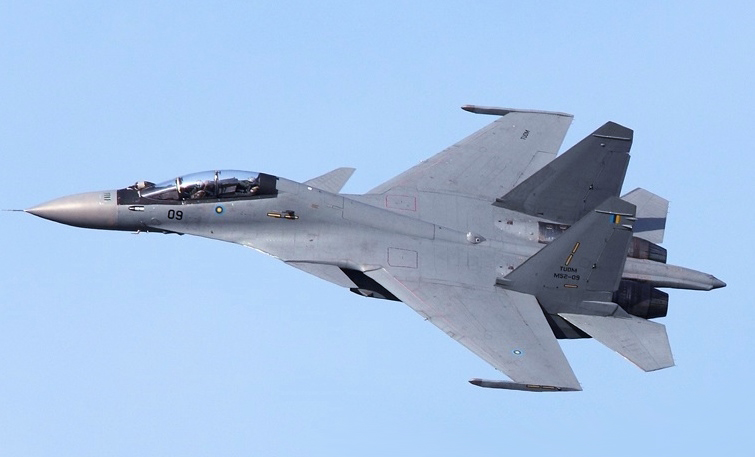
Royal Malaysian Air Force Sukhoi Su-30MKM

Malaysia ordered 18 Su-30MKMs in May 2003. The first two Su-30MKMs were formally handed over in Irkutsk on 23 May 2007 and arrived in Malaysia at RMAF Gong Kedak Air Base in Terengganu on 21 June 2007. As part of the contract agreement, Russia sent the first Malaysian cosmonaut to the International Space Station in October 2007. In 2014, Malaysia had 18 Su-30MKMs in service.

According to Malaysian defence Minister Mohamad Sabu, Malaysia has grounded 14 of 18 Su-30MKM due to engine problems and unavailability of spare parts in 2018. To overcome this problem and increase the readiness of the Su-30MKM fleets, Malaysia has approved the budget worth RM2.2 billion for the Su-30MKM to be upgraded locally by Aerospace Technology Systems Corporation. The first upgraded aircraft was received in 2019 in LIMA 2019 exhibition.

=== Venezuela ===
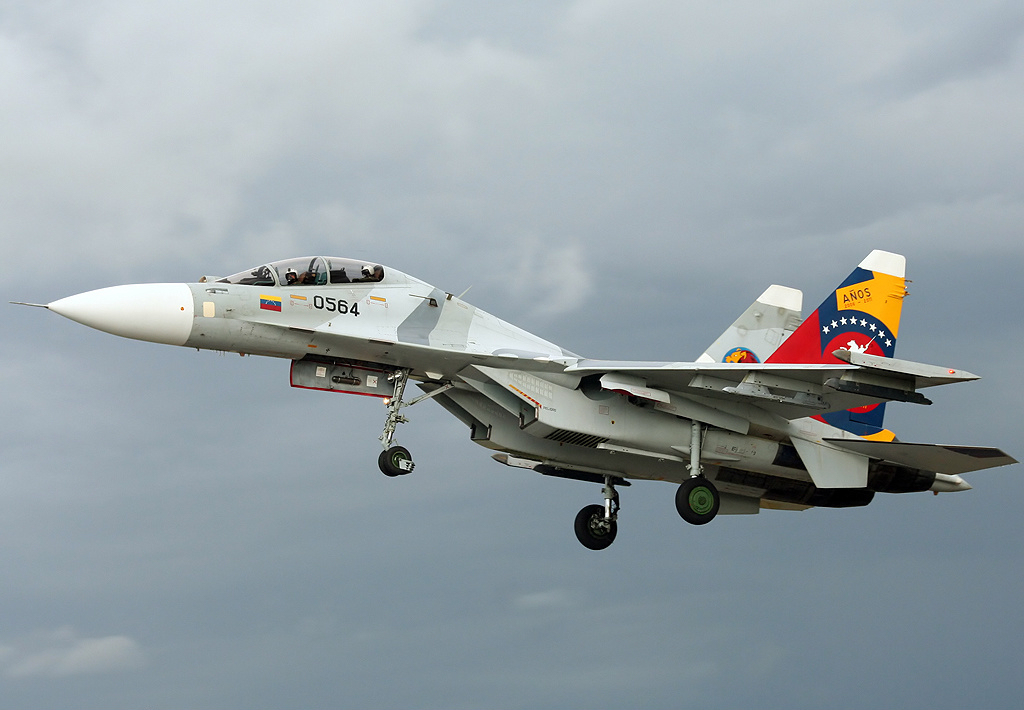
Venezuelan Air Force Su-30MK2

The Government of Venezuela announced on 14 June 2006 it would purchase 24 Su-30MKV fighters from Russia. The first two Su-30MK2s arrived in early December 2006 while another eight were commissioned during 2007; 14 more aircraft arrived in 2008. In October 2015, Venezuela announced the purchase of 12 more Su-30MKVs from Russia for US$480 million.

=== Algeria ===
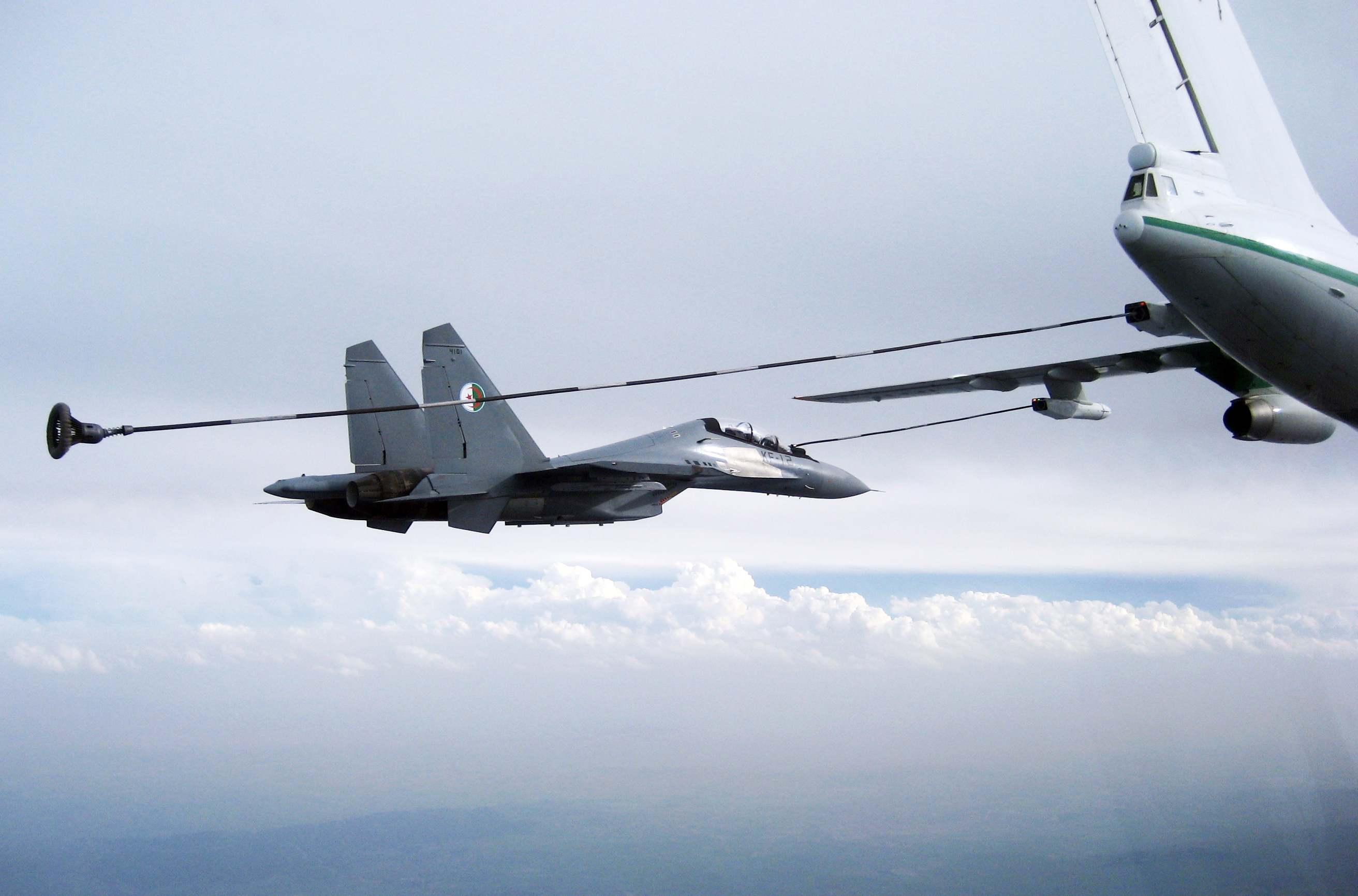
Algerian Air Force Su-30MKA refuelled by Il-78 Midas

As part of wider US$8 billion deal signed with Russia in 2006, that also included 34 MiG-29 fighters and number of Yak-130 trainers, Algeria has ordered 28 Su-30MKAs for its air force. It was to receive additional 16 Su-30MKAs in exchange for the 39 MiG-29s rejected due to quality disputes and old equipment used. By 2015, it had 44 Su-30MKAs in service with 14 more on order.

In September 2019, Algeria ordered 16 more aircraft. As of 2022, it has 70 Su-30MKAs in service.

=== Uganda ===
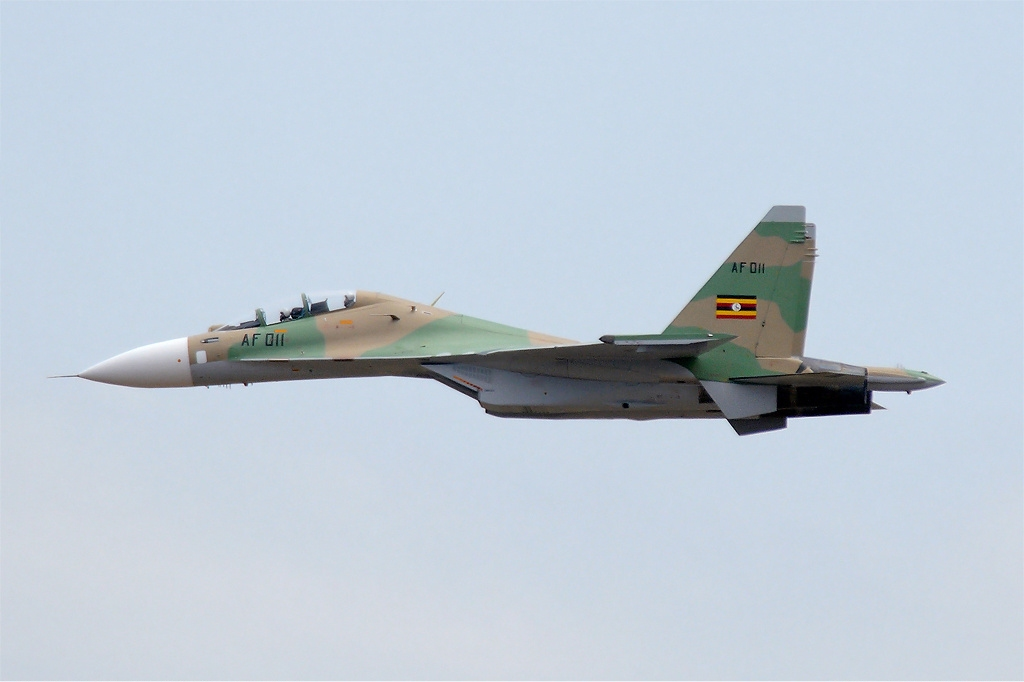
Uganda People's Defence Force Air Wing Su-30MK2

Uganda signed a contract for six Su-30MK2s in 2010. Deliveries took place between June 2011 and June 2012. In November 2011, one aircraft performed a belly landing at Entebbe International Airport. It was later repaired.

=== Indonesia ===
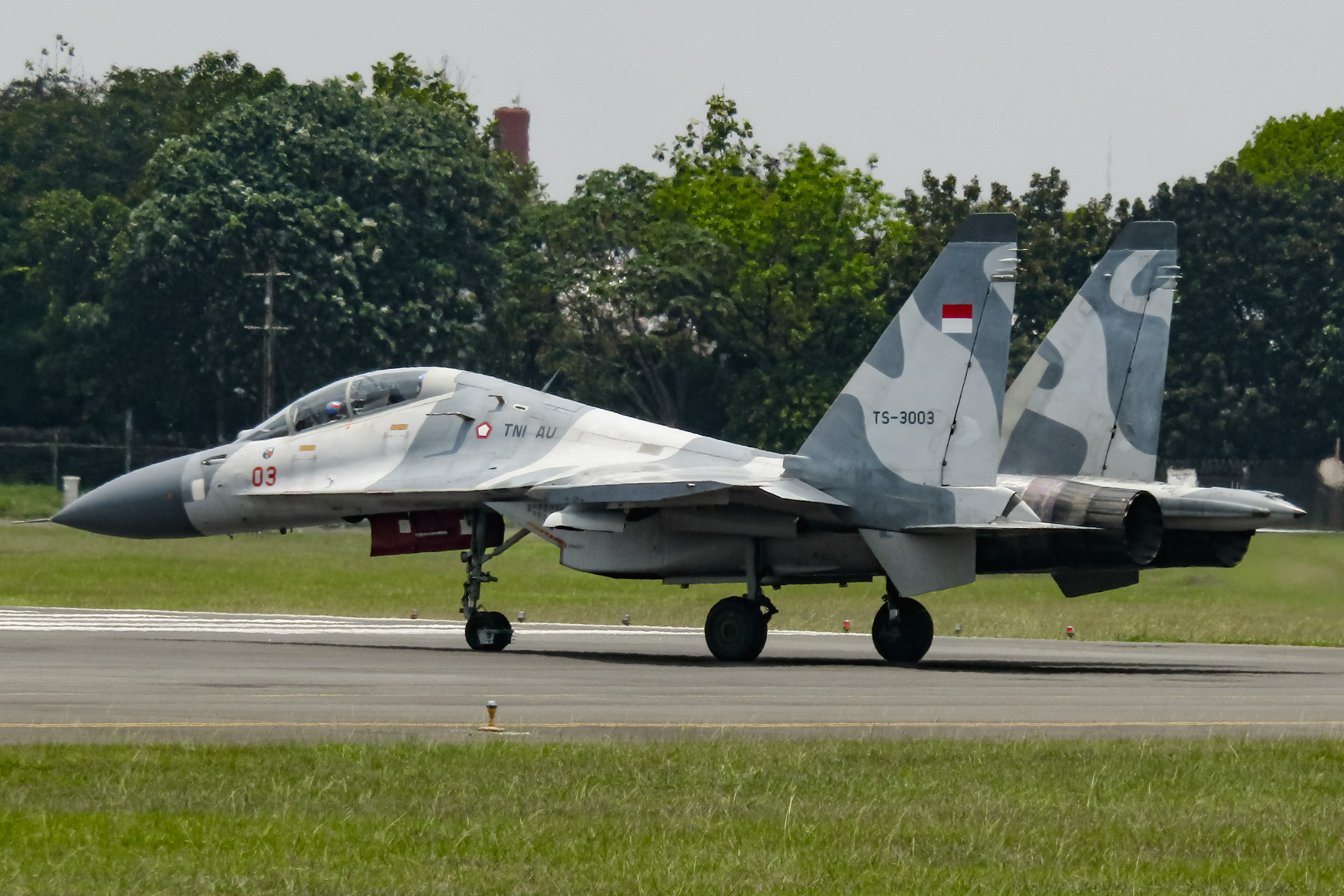
SU-30MK2 tail number TS-3003 operated by Indonesian Air Force

In 2001, reports emerged that Indonesia had an interest to acquire about 16 Su-30 fighters, as a replacement for its aging fleet of 12 F-16A/B and F-5E/F fighters. From 2003 to 2011, and because of the U.S-imposed arms embargo against it, it has ordered a combined 11 Su-30MKK/MK2s (2 Su-30MKK and 9 Su-30MK2) for the Air Force. In September 2013, it had all Su-30MKK/MK2s in inventory. The aircraft were upgraded by Belarus in 2019.

=== Angola ===
As part of a US$1 billion deal that also includes other equipment and maintenance services for the country, Angola has ordered 12 out of 18 former Indian Su-30K fighters on 16 October 2013. The Su-30Ks were initially delivered to India in 1997–1998, but were returned to Russia in 2007 in exchange for 18 full-fledged Su-30MKI fighters. Angola received first two aircraft in September 2017, and the rest by April 2019. Angolan Su-30Ks were also upgraded to the "SM" standard.

=== Vietnam ===
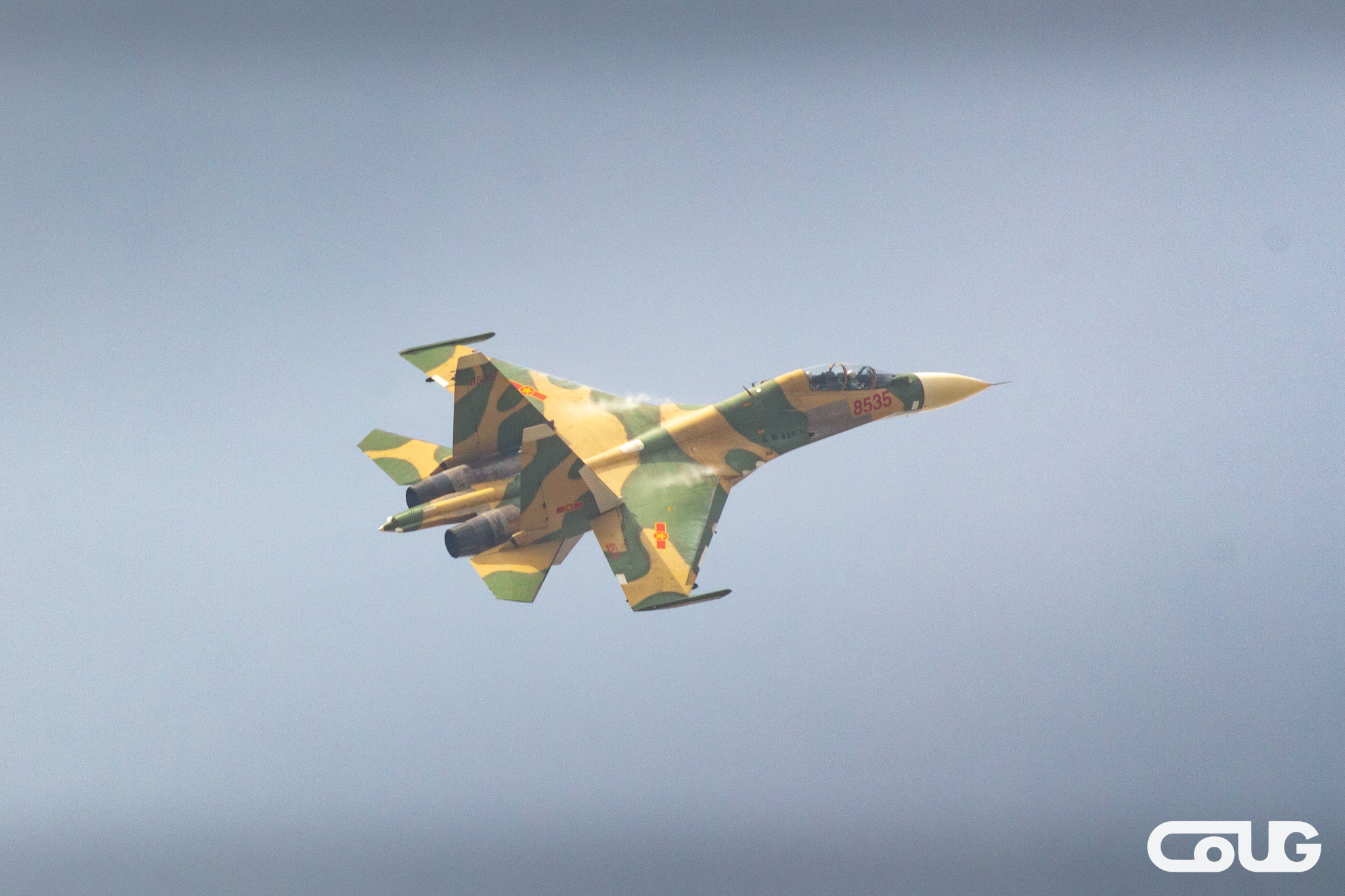
Vietnamese Su-30MK2 no. 8535 flying over Ho Chi Minh City.

Vietnam has received about 20 Su-30MK2s under two contracts signed in 2009 and 2010, respectively. On 21 August 2013, Russia announced it would deliver another batch of 12 Su-30MK2s under a $450 million contract, with deliveries in 2014–2015.

On 14 June 2016, a Su-30MK2 of the Vietnamese Air Force went missing during a training flight 30–40 km off the coast of Nghệ An Province. One out of the two pilots survived. At the time, there were some 32 Su-30MK2s in service.

=== Kazakhstan ===
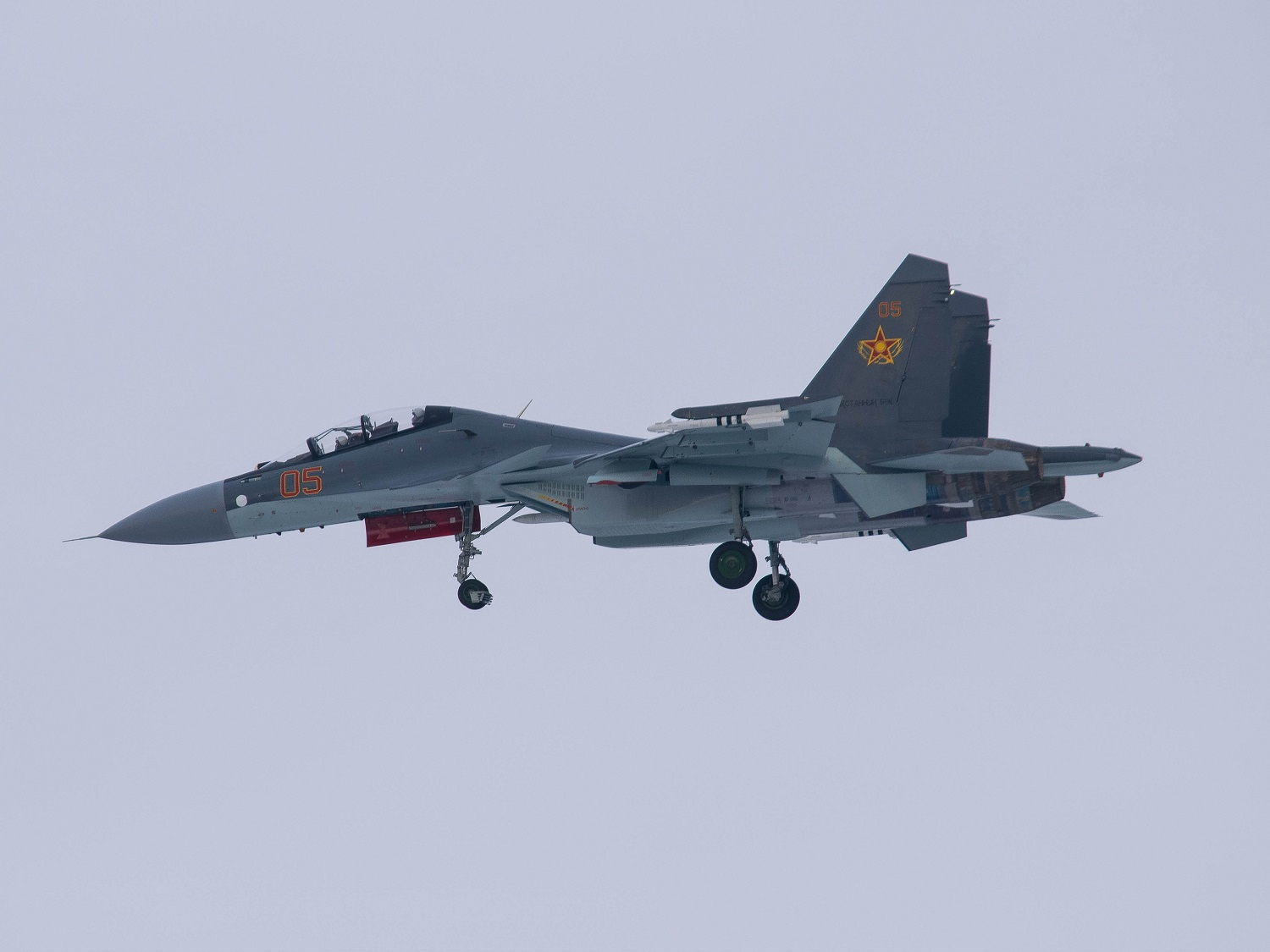
Kazakh Sukhoi Su-30SM at Irkutsk-2

Kazakhstan has ordered in total 24 Su-30SM fighters under three contracts. It received first four Su-30SMs under the first contract worth of RUB 5 billion in April 2015.

The first two aircraft of the second order were delivered in December 2016. The third order for 12 more aircraft was approved in August 2017 and eight aircraft were ordered in May 2018. It had 12 Su-30SMs in service as of December 2018.

=== Armenia ===
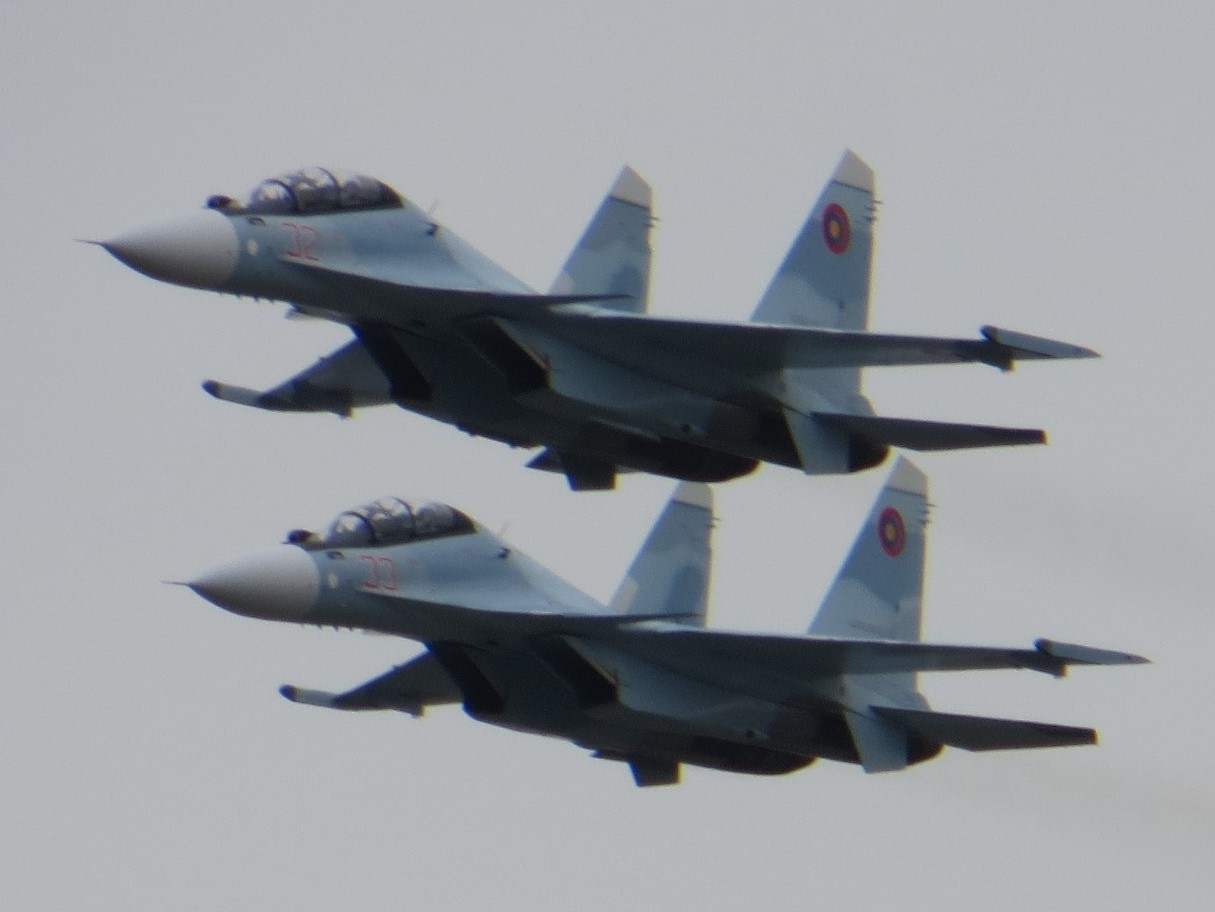
Armenian Air Force's Sukhoi jets

In January 2016, then Armenian Defense Minister Seyran Ohanyan mentioned that Russia had discussed the possibility of supplying Su-30 fighters to Armenia during a four-day Russian-Armenian intergovernmental commission on bilateral military-technical cooperation. Armenia has ordered four Su-30SMs in February 2019, with deliveries expected to begin in 2020. The country plans to acquire additional Su-30SM aircraft, according to the Armenian Defense Minister David Tonoyan.

In August 2020, negotiations were under way to acquire a new batch of Su-30SM fighters, according to Armenian Defense Minister David Tonoyan.

In March 2021, Nikol Pashinyan, Prime Minister of Armenia, confirmed that Armenia bought Su-30SM fighters without missiles package from Russia.

These aircraft were left unused in the 2020 Nagorno-Karabakh war as a result of the purchase of aircraft without missiles. On 16 September 2024, Armenia reached out to India for assistance in procuring Astra missiles for their Su-30s. Assistance was also being sought from HAL for their expertise in upgrading the Su-30. On 31 May 2026, Armenian Su-30s were spotted carrying Yasin precision guided glide bombs.

=== Belarus ===
In February 2016, Russia and Belarus concluded a preliminary agreement regarding to the export of an undisclosed number of Su-30s to Belarus. On 20 June 2017, during the Le Bourget international air show, Belarus signed a contract to purchase 12 Su-30SMs under a deal worth US$600 million and were originally planned to be delivered in 2018. Western embargoes on components delayed delivery, with the first four aircraft arriving at Baranovichi Air Base in November 2019, with four more planned to arrive to 2020 with deliveries completed in 2021. 8 additional Su-30s were scheduled to arrive in 2024.

==== Russian invasion of Ukraine ====
On 13 July 2024, a Russian Shahed drone entered Belarusian air space without authorization. A Belarusian Su-30 was sortied to intercept the drone. The drone eventually crashed in western Belarus, 60 miles west of Minsk.

=== Mongolia ===
The Mongolian Air Forces (MAF) have received a first Sukhoi Su-30SM "Flanker-H" multirole fighter aircraft from Russia in March 2019. According Commander Mongolian Air Forces Colonel Enkhbayar said, the delivered aircraft are the remaining four Su-30SMs ordered under this first contract. Mongolian Air Forces a framework agreement signed its intention to buy 12 Su-30SMs from Russia. The total cost of the contract is $600 million.

=== Potential operators ===
==== Iran ====
In February 2016, Iran's then Defense Minister Hossein Dehghan during his visit to Moscow announced that the country intends to buy an undisclosed number of Su-30SM fighters. In June 2026 multiple Russian sources reported that Iranian Air Force had finalized a deal to acquire 12 second-hand Su-30SM2 fighter jets from Russia, with deliveries beginning in mid-2027.

==== Argentina ====
In 2021, Russia offered the Argentine Air Force a batch of 15 MiG-29 fighters and another batch of 12 Su-30 fighters. In the same negotiations they also offered the sale of Yak-130 training jets and Mil Mi-17 helicopters.

== Variants ==
=== Early variants ===
Su-30 (Su-27PU) (Flanker-C)
PU for Punkt Upravlenija - "Control Point" or Perechvatcik Uchebnyj - "Interceptor Trainer". Modernized Su-27UB - Uchebno - boyevoy - "Trainer / combat fighter". 5 units operated by the Russian Air Defence Forces.
Su-30K
Commercial (export) version of the basic Su-30. Initially 8 + 10 with French avionics were delivered to India with plans to upgrade to final Su-30MKI configuration, but later all 18 were returned to Russia, and 12 were resold to Angola.
Su-27KI / Su-30KI
Proposed export version for Indonesia and cancelled because of the 1997 Asian financial crisis. The prototype was converted from a Su-27SK in 1998, and then converted into the Su-27SKM prototype in 2003.
Su-30KN
Proposed low-cost mid-life upgrade for the Su-30 including tactical strike. The prototype was converted from a production Su-30 and first flew in March 1999.
Su-30MK (Flanker-H)
Upgraded Su-30 for tactical strike. The prototype was converted from the first production Su-30 and was displayed at the 1993 International Defence Exhibition. Mk stands for "upgraded export version" (modernizeerovannyy kommehrcheskiy.)

=== Flanker-H family ===
Su-30MKI (Flanker-H)
MKI for Modernizirovannyi Kommercheskiy Indiski - "Modernized Commercial Indian". An export version for India, jointly developed with Hindustan Aeronautics Limited (HAL). It is the first Su-30 family member to feature thrust vectoring control (TVC) and canards. Equipped with a multinational avionics complex sourced from Russia, India, France and Israel.

Su-30MKA (Flanker-H)
A version of the Su-30MKI sold to Algeria. All of the Israeli equipment, like the head-up display and the digital map generator, is replaced by Indian equivalents.

Su-30MKM (Flanker-H)
A derivative of the Russian-Indian Su-30MKI, the MKM is a highly specialized version for Royal Malaysian Air Force. It includes thrust vectoring control and canards but with avionics from various countries. It will feature head-up displays (HUD), navigational forward-looking IR system (NAVFLIR) and Damocles Laser Designation pod (LDP) from Thales Group of France, MAW-300 missile approach warning sensor (MAWS), RWS-50 RWR and laser warning sensor (LWS) from SAAB AVITRONICS (South Africa) as well as the Russian NIIP N011M Bars Passive electronically scanned array radar, electronic warfare (EW) system, optical-location system (OLS) and a glass cockpit.

Su-30SM (Flanker-H)
SM for Serijnyi Modernizirovannyi - "Serial Modernized". Announced 2011, a specialized version of the thrust-vectoring Su-30MKI for the VKS to be produced by the Irkut Corporation. NATO reporting name Flanker-H. The Su-30SM is considered a 4+ generation fighter jet. The aircraft has been upgraded according to Russian military requirements for radar, radio communications systems, friend-or-foe identification system, ejection seats, weapons, and other aircraft systems. It is equipped with the N011M Bars radar with a maximum detection range 400 km, search range 200 km using a phased array antenna, frontal horizontal fins and steerable thrusters for supermaneuvrability as well as with wide-angle HUD. The aircraft can be used to gain air supremacy same as for targeting adversary on the ground using wide range of weapons including air-to-air, air-to-surface and guided and unguided bombs with total weapons weight up to 8,000 kg. It is also equipped with the one barrel, 30 mm GSh-30-1 autocannon. To ensure operations at major distances from airfield, the ability of in-flight refuelling (IFR) is included.
Su-30SME (Flanker-H)
Su-30SME is the export version of the Su-30SM, with foreign avionics of other Su-30MKI derivatives replaced with Russian systems, and the possible downgrade of certain systems such as the radar modes and fire control. It was unveiled at the Singapore Airshow 2016, and has been offered to Iran, Bangladesh, Uzbekistan, and Myanmar.

Su-30SM2 (Flanker-H)
It is an upgrade project of Russian Su-30SM fighters. The SM2 Upgrade is notable for its enhanced detection range and strengthened armament, thanks to the integration of the Irbis-E radar and more powerful AL-41F1S engines. This radar significantly increases the aircraft's detection range for both aerial and maritime targets. The AL-41F1S engines, also used in the Su-35S, offer increased thrust and a longer lifespan, thereby improving the aircraft's overall performance.

=== Flanker-G family ===
Su-30MKK (Flanker-G)
MKK for Modernizirovanniy Kommercheskiy Kitayskiy - "Modernized Commercial for China". An export version for China. NATO reporting name Flanker-G.
Su-30MK2 (Flanker-G+)
Modernized Su-30MKK for China, Indonesia and Uganda with advanced avionics and weapons.
Su-30MKV/Su-30MK2 AMV (Flanker-G+)
To avoid confusion after Vietnam also placed an order for Su-30MK2, the designation for those ordered by Venezuela was changed from the original Su-30MKV to Su-30MK2 AMV with AMV standing for Aviacion Militar Venezolana (Venezuelan Military Aviation).
Su-30MK2V (Flanker-G+)
Export version of Su-30MK2 for Vietnam with modifications such as redesigned ejection seat to accommodate the smaller body frames of Vietnamese pilots, and other minor modification of upgrading communications gear. The original designation Su-30MKV caused confusion with those Su-30MK2s ordered by Venezuela, which already had Su-30MKV designation, so to avoid confusion, Su-30MK2s ordered by Vietnam was redesignated Su-30MK2V. Vietnam still internally designates it Su-30MK2 with the MK2V designation rarely used.
Su-30M2 (Flanker-G+)
A Su-30MK2 version developed by KnAAPO. The Russian Air Force placed an initial order for the variant in 2009. Factory tests were completed in September 2010.

== Operators ==
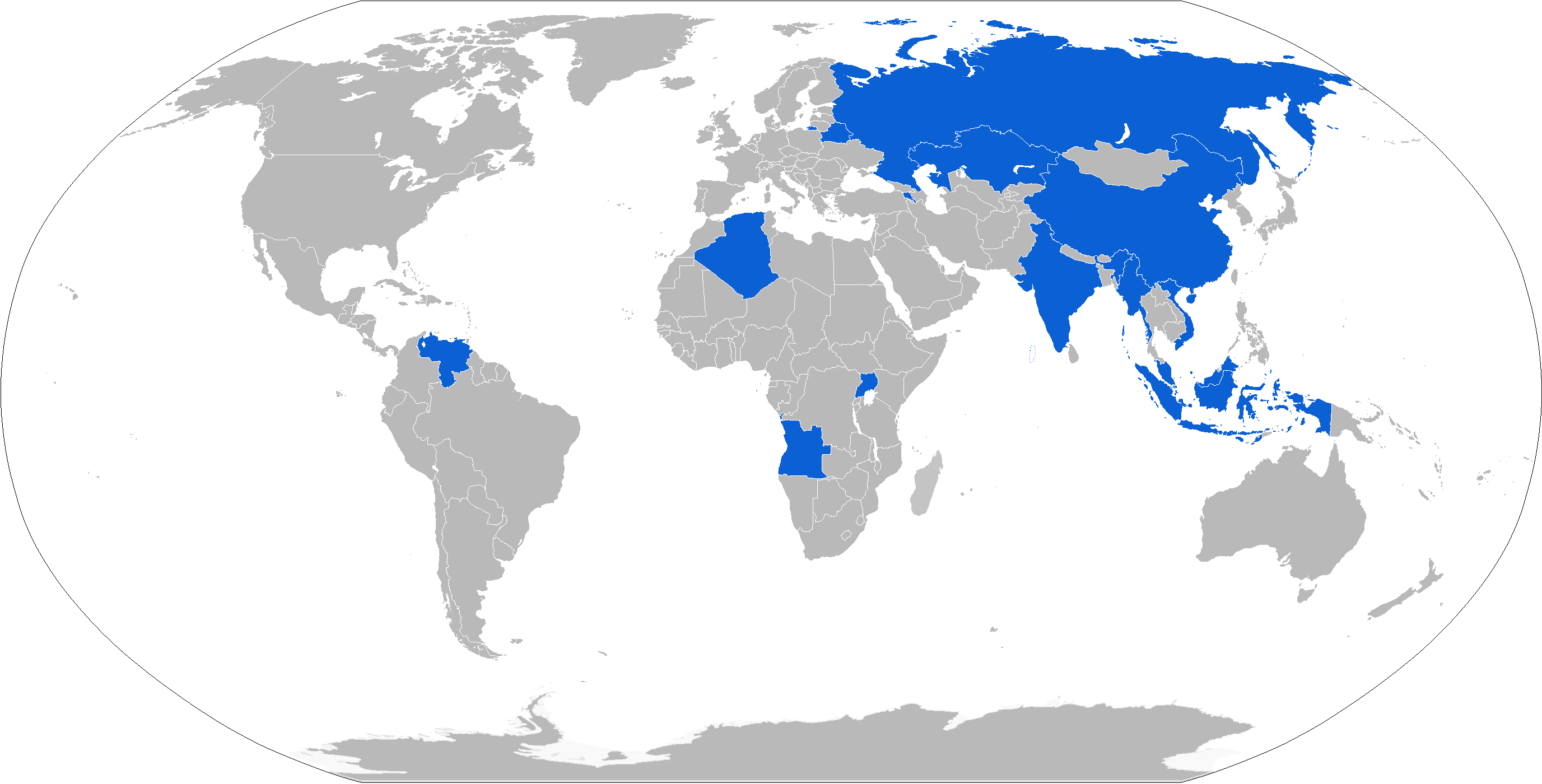
Map with Sukhoi Su-30 operators in blue

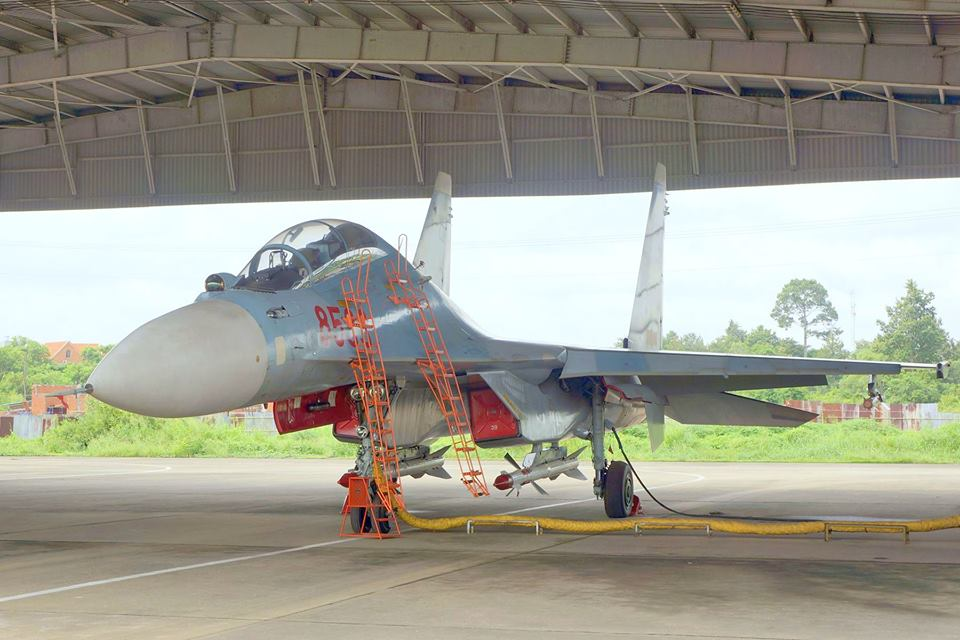
Vietnamese Sukhoi Su-30MK2 with R-73 and R-27 AAMs

Algeria

- Algerian Air Force – 59 Su-30MKA (2024)

Angola

- Angolan Air Force – 12 Su-30K (2024)

Armenia

- Armenian Air Force – 4 Su-30SM (2024)

Belarus

- Belarusian Air Force – 8 Su-30SMs and 6 Su-30SM2s in inventory as of December 2025. 2 more Su-30SM2s were delivered in January 2026.

Ethiopia

- Ethiopian Air Force - 2 Su-30K (2024)

India

- Indian Air Force – 261 Su-30MKI (2024) – 12 ordered in late-2024.

Indonesia

- Indonesian Air Force – 11 Su-30MK2 (2024)

Kazakhstan

- Kazakh Air Force – 29 Su-30SM (2024)

Malaysia

- Royal Malaysian Air Force – 18 Su-30MKM (2024)

Myanmar

- Myanmar Air Force – 6 Su-30SME (2024), ordered in 2018 and delivered from 2022 to 2024

Mongolia

- Mongolian Air Force - 4 Su-30SM

People's Republic of China

- People's Liberation Army Air Force – 24 Su-30MK2, 73 Su-30MKK (2024)

Russia

- Russian Aerospace Forces – 19 Su-30M2, estimated 80 Su-30SM, 4+ Su-30SM2 (2024). New deliveries were conducted in late 2023, mid–2024, and mid–2026.
- Russian Naval Aviation – Approximately 17 Su-30SM and 8+ Su-30SM2 (2024). 2 more were delivered in 2025. 50 aircraft planned in total.

Uganda

- Ugandan Air Force – 6 Su-30MK2 (2024)

Venezuela

- Venezuelan Air Force – 14 Su-30MKV (2026)

Vietnam

- Vietnam Air Force – 35 Su-30MK2V (2024)

== Specifications (Su-27PU/Su-30) ==
Sukhoi Su-30 3-view drawing

Data from KnAAPO, Sukhoi, Gordon and Davison, deagel.com, Airforce technology

General characteristics

- Crew: 2
- Length: 21.935 m (72 ft 0 in)
- Wingspan: 14.7 m (48 ft 3 in)
- Height: 6.36 m (20 ft 10 in)
- Wing area: 62 m^{2} (670 sq ft)
- Empty weight: 17,700 kg (39,022 lb)
- Gross weight: 24,900 kg (54,895 lb)
- Max takeoff weight: 34,500 kg (76,059 lb)
- Fuel capacity: 9,400 kg (20,723 lb) internal
- Powerplant: 2 × Saturn AL-31FL/FP Afterburning turbofan engines, 74.5 kN (16,700 lbf) thrust each dry, 122.58 kN (27,560 lbf) with afterburner

Performance

- Maximum speed: 2,120 km/h (1,320 mph, 1,140 kn) at high altitude
- Maximum speed: Mach 2
  - Mach 1.9 with canards
- Range: 3,000 km (1,900 mi, 1,600 nmi) at high altitude
- Service ceiling: 17,300 m (56,800 ft)
- g limits: +9
- Rate of climb: 230 m/s (45,000 ft/min)
- Wing loading: 401 kg/m^{2} (82 lb/sq ft) with 56% fuel

468.3 kg/m^{2} (95.9 lb/sq ft) with full internal fuel

- Thrust/weight: 1 with 56% fuel

0.86 with full internal fuel

Armament

- Guns: 1 × 30 mm Gryazev-Shipunov GSh-30-1 autocannon with 150 rounds
- Hardpoints: 12 hardpoints with a capacity of up to 8,000 kg (18,000 lb), with provisions to carry combinations of:
  - Rockets:
    - S-8KOM/BM/OM
    - S-13T/OF
    - S-25OFM-PU
  - Missiles:
    - Air-to-air missiles:
      - R-27R/ER/T/ET/P/EA
      - R-73E/M
      - RVV-AE(R-77)-1/M
      - R-37M (on the SM2 variant)
    - Air-to-surface missiles:
      - Kh-29TE/L
      - Kh-59M/ME
    - Anti-ship missiles:
      - Kh-31A
    - Anti-radiation missiles:
      - Kh-31P
  - Bombs:
    - KAB-500KR general-purpose bomb
    - KAB-500OD bomb
    - KAB-1500KR GP bomb
    - KAB-1500L laser-guided bomb
    - FAB-500T GP bomb
    - BETAB-500SHP bomb
    - ODAB-500PM bomb
    - OFAB-250-270 bomb
    - OFAB-100-120 bomb
    - P-50T bomb
    - RBK-500 cluster bombs
    - SPBE-D bomb

Avionics

- Radar depends on variants:
  - Bars N011M radar for Su-30SM, Su-30SME, Su-30MKI, Su-30MKM, Su-30MKA
  - Myech radar for Su-30MKK and derivatives
  - Irbis-E radar for Su-30SM2
- OEPS-27 electro-optical targeting system
- OLS-30 IRST
- SPO-150 Radar Warning Receiver
- Shchel-3UM Helmet-mounted display system

== Accidents and notable incidents ==
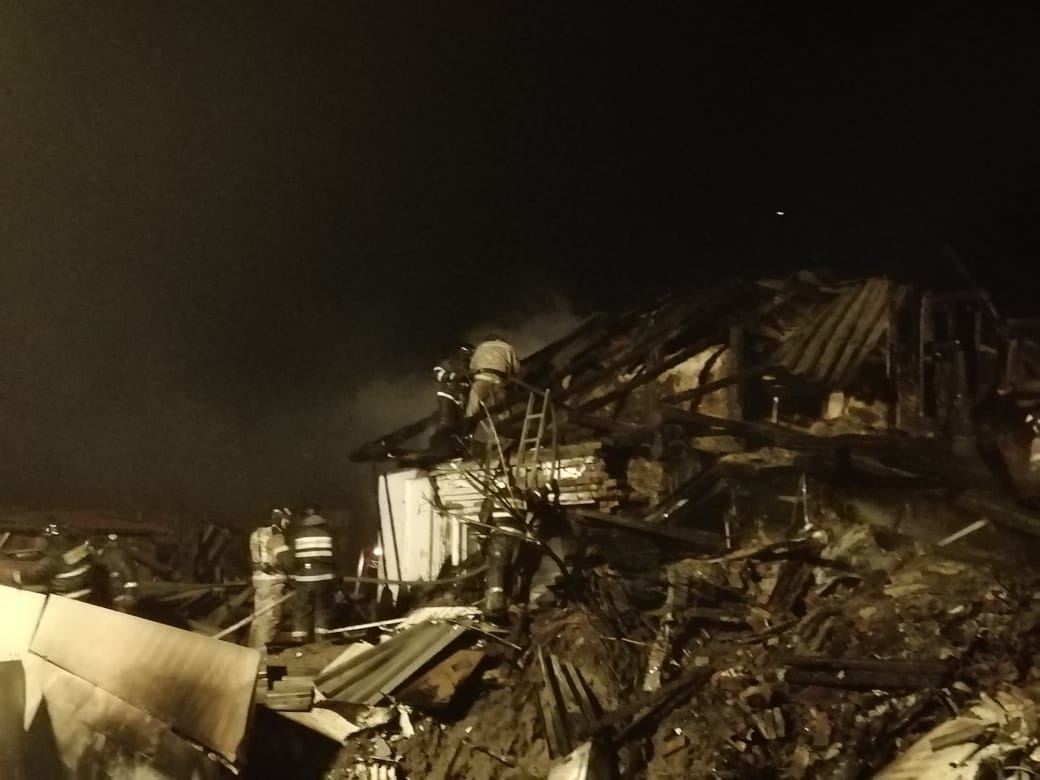
Su-30 crash site in Irkutsk

- On 12 June 1999, a Russian Su-30MK crashed at the Paris Air Show, Le Bourget, France. Both pilots ejected safely and no one was hurt on the ground.
- On 22 September 2020, a Russian Su-30M2 was shot down by a Su-35S during air combat training which pitted two Su-35S against one Su-30M2. When the pilot of a Su-35S pulled the trigger to record the simulated hit, the jet fired a burst from its 30mm GSh-30-1 cannon, hitting the right wing of the Su-30M2, leaving the aircraft uncontrollable and forcing its crew to eject.
- Between 1 and 6 April 2022, a Russian Su-30SM, code 60 Red (RF-81771) was shot down by Ukrainian Forces near Izyums’Kyi District in the Kharkiv region.
- On 23 October 2022, a Russian Su-30SM crashed into a residential building in the Siberian city of Irkutsk during a test flight. The two pilots died in the crash, but there were no casualties on the ground. Investigators suspect that the aircraft's oxygen system had been refilled with nitrogen, which caused both pilots to become unconscious and lose control of the aircraft in flight.
- On 12 August 2023, a Russian Su-30 crashed in the Kaliningrad region during a training flight. Both airmen were killed.
- On 16 October 2025, friendly fire shot down one Sukhoi Su-30SM over Crimea.
- On 21 October 2026, a navy Su-30SM crashed after a mid-air collision with another aircraft of the same type during a training exercise in Kaliningrad. Both pilots from the first Su-30SM successfully ejected and survived, and the second aircraft landed safely with moderate damage. Coincidentally on the same day another Su-30SM crashed in the Moscow Region, although it was initially an unconfirmed report released by Russian milbloggers. Later the deaths of two Russian Knights aerobatic team pilots, Colonel Oleg Erofeev and Lieutenant Colonel Vladimir Kochetov, were announced by official Russian sources, indicating that the aircraft was likely one of the team's air display jets.

== See also ==
- Fourth-generation jet fighter

Related development

- Sukhoi Su-27/Shenyang J-11
- Sukhoi Su-33
- Sukhoi Su-34
- Sukhoi Su-35
- Sukhoi Su-37
- Shenyang J-16

Aircraft of comparable role, configuration, and era

- Boeing F/A-18E/F Super Hornet
- McDonnell Douglas F-15E Strike Eagle
- Dassault Rafale
- Eurofighter Typhoon
- Mikoyan MiG-35

Related lists

- List of fighter aircraft
- List of military aircraft of the Soviet Union and the CIS

== Sources ==
- Gordon, Yefim; Davison, Peter (2006). Sukhoi Su-27 Flanker. Warbird Tech. Vol. 42. Specialty Press, 2006. ISBN 978-1-58007-091-1.
- Gordon, Yefim (2007). Sukhoi Su-27 Flanker. Famous Russian Aircraft. Hinkley, England: Midland Publishing. ISBN 978-1-85780-247-4.
- International Institute for Strategic Studies (2025). The Military Balance 2025. London: Routledge. ISBN 978-1-041-04967-8.
