= Millerovsky District =

Millerovsky District Миллеровский район (Russian)
- District
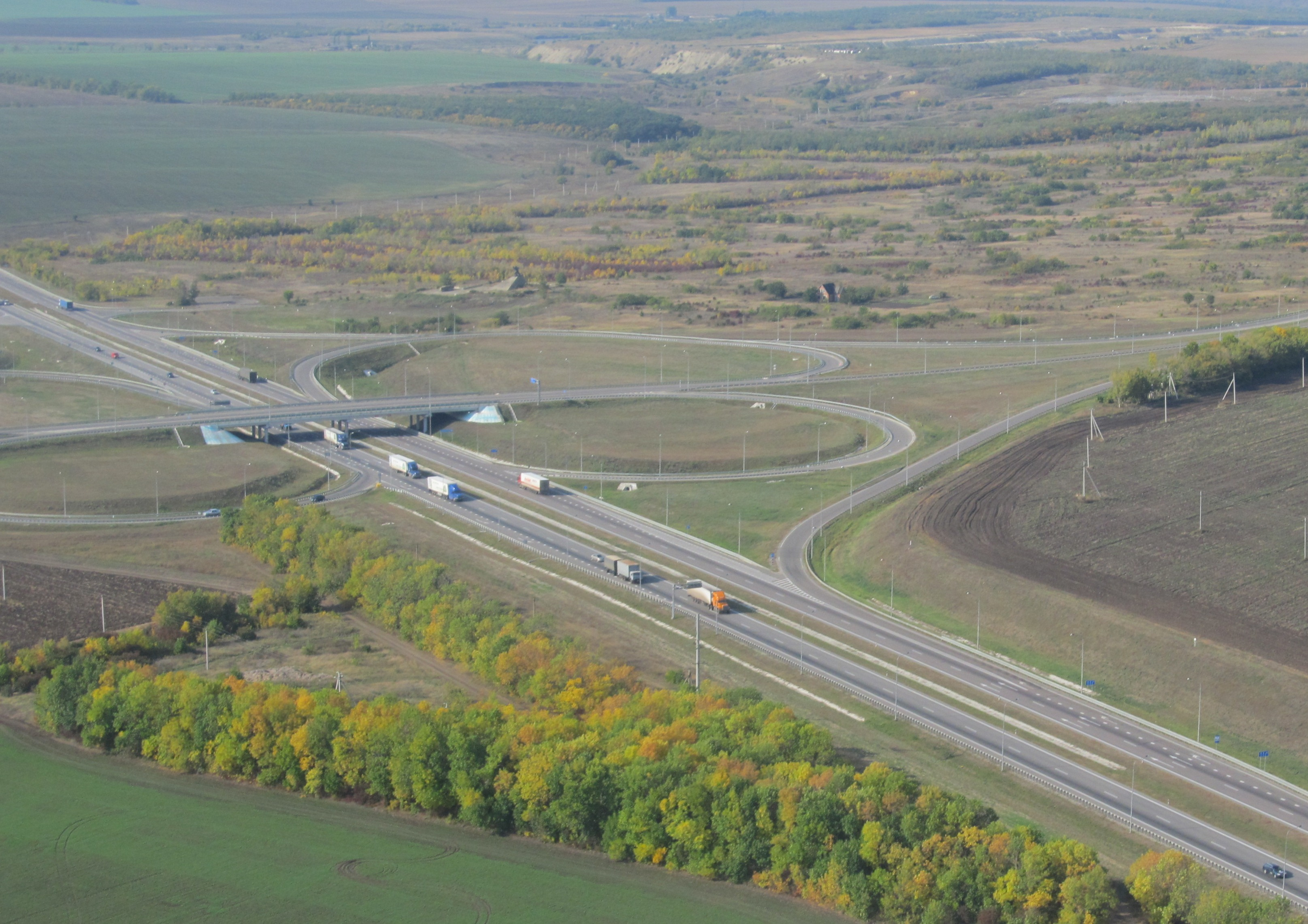
- Federal Highway M4 ("Don") at Lugansk, Millerovsky District

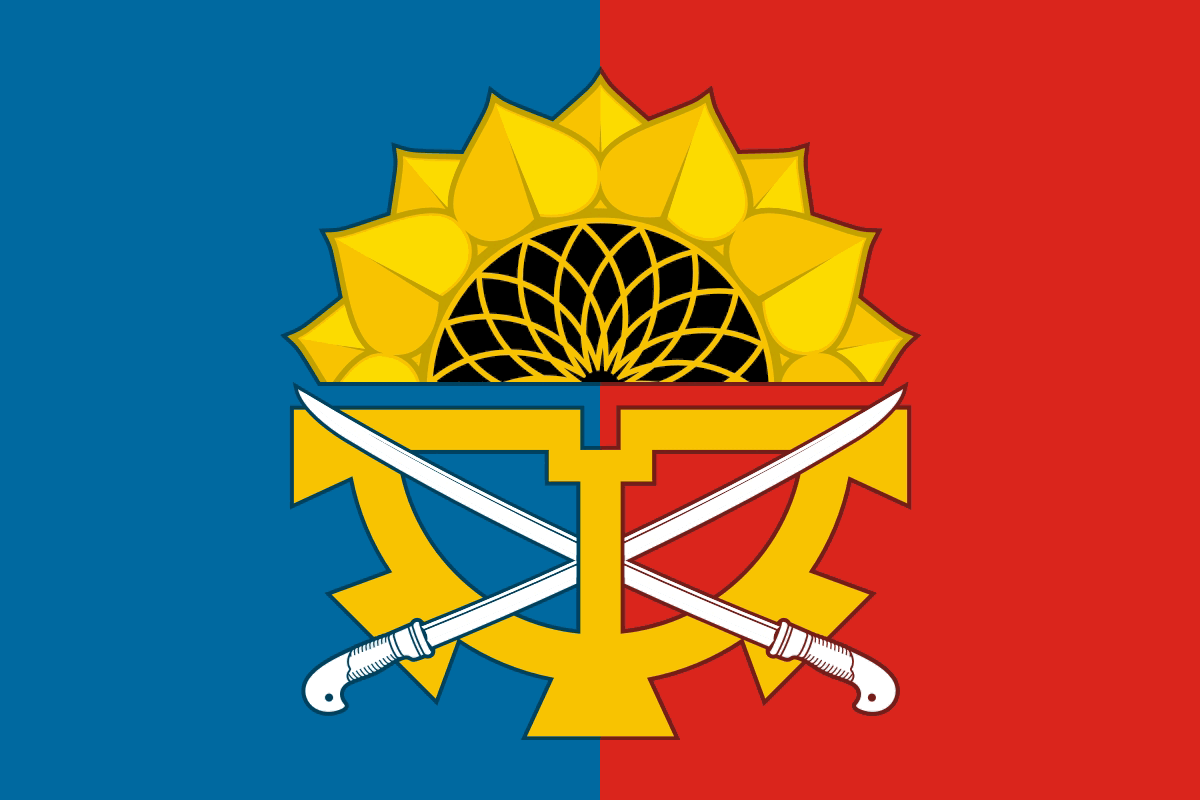
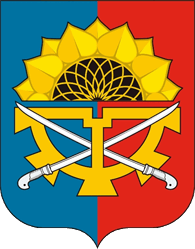
- Flag Coat of arms
- Location of Millerovsky District in Rostov Oblast
- Coordinates: 48°55′N 40°24′E
- Country: Russia
- Federal subject: Rostov Oblast
- Established: 1965
- Administrative center: Millerovo

Area
  - Total: 3,237 km^{2} (1,250 sq mi)

Population (2010 Census)
  - Total: 68,360
  - Density: 21.12/km^{2} (54.70/sq mi)
  - Urban: 53.4%
  - Rural: 46.6%

Administrative structure
  - Administrative divisions: 1 Urban settlements, 12 Rural settlements
  - Inhabited localities: 1 cities/towns, 117 rural localities

Municipal structure
  - Municipally incorporated as: Millerovsky Municipal District
  - Municipal divisions: 1 urban settlements, 12 rural settlements
- Time zone: UTC+3 (MSK)
- OKTMO ID: 60632000
- Website: http://www.millerovoland.ru/index.php?option=com_content&view=category&id=242

Millerovsky District (Russian: Ми́ллеровский райо́н) is an administrative and municipal district (raion), one of the forty-three in Rostov Oblast, Russia. It is located in the northwest of the oblast. The area of the district is 3,237 square kilometers (1,250 sq mi). Its administrative center is the town of Millerovo. Population: 68,360 (2010 Census); 36,591 (2002 census); 36,468 (1989 Soviet census). The population of Millerovo accounts for 53.4% of the district's total population. The district contains the Millerovo air base.
