= Millerovo, Millerovsky District, Rostov Oblast =

Town in Rostov Oblast, Russia

Millerovo Миллерово
- Town
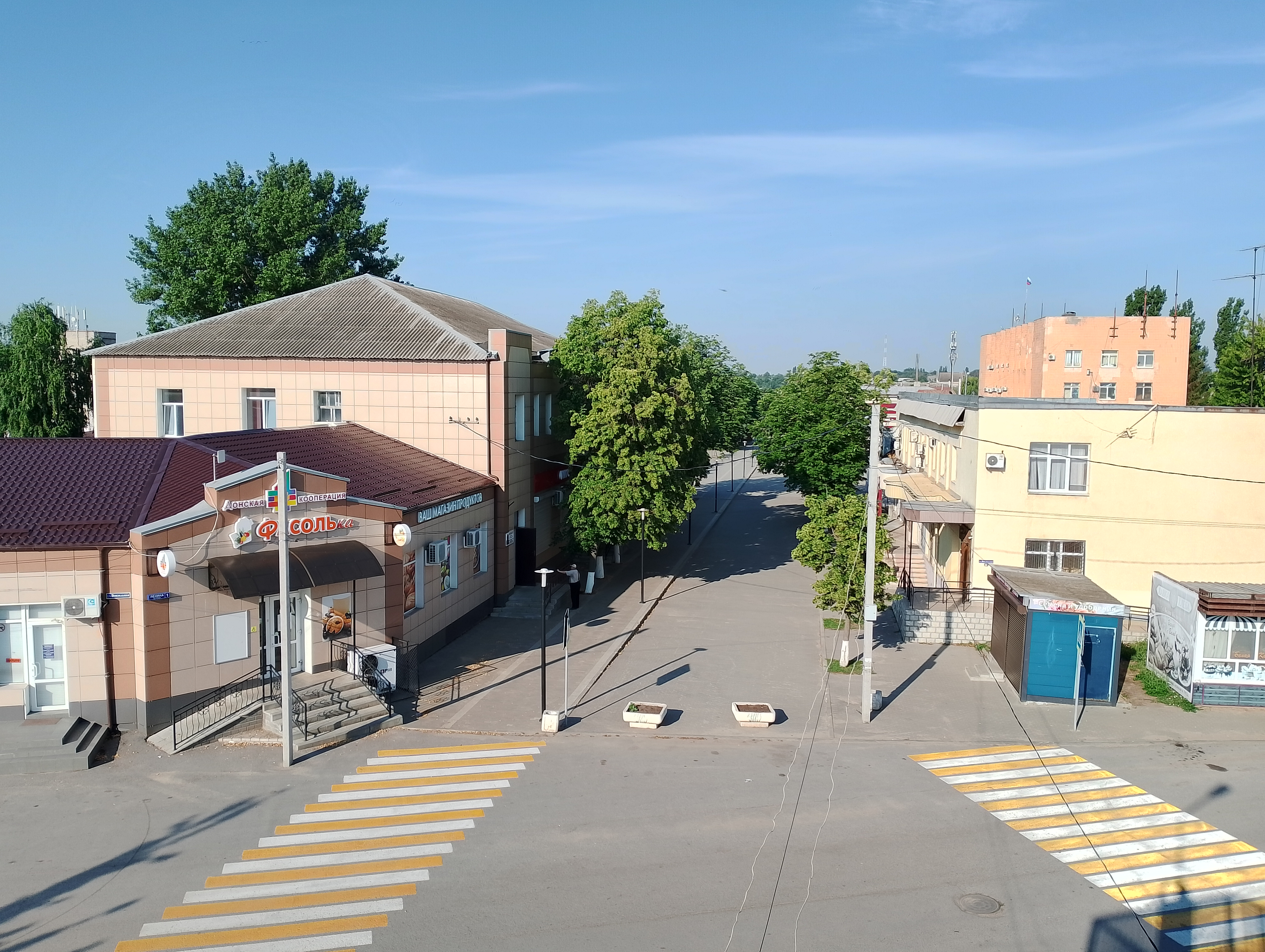

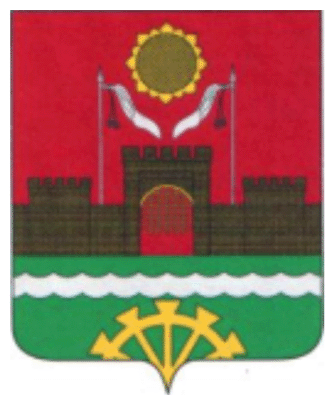
- Coat of arms
- Interactive map of Millerovo
- Location of Millerovo Millerovo (European Russia) Millerovo (Russia)
- Coordinates: 48°55′N 40°23′E
- Country: Russia
- Federal subject: Rostov Oblast
- Administrative district: Millerovsky District
- Urban settlementSelsoviet: Millerovskoye
- Founded: 1786
- Town status since: 1926
- Elevation: 130 m (430 ft)

Population (2010 Census)
  - Total: 36,499
  - Estimate (2025): 34,246 (−6.2%)

Administrative status
  - Capital of: Millerovsky District, Millerovskoye Urban Settlement

Municipal status
  - Municipal district: Millerovsky Municipal District
  - Urban settlement: Millerovskoye Urban Settlement
  - Capital of: Millerovsky Municipal District, Millerovskoye Urban Settlement
- Time zone: UTC+3 (MSK)
- Postal codes: 346130–346132, 346134, 346139
- OKTMO ID: 60632101001
- Website: www.millerovo.name

Millerovo (Russian: Ми́ллерово, Ukrainian: Міллерово) is a town and the administrative center of Millerovsky District in Rostov Oblast, Russia, close to the border with Ukraine. Population 36,499 (2010 census); 38,498 (2002 census); 37,346 (1989 Soviet census).

== History ==
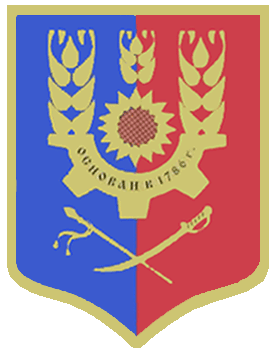
Coat of Arms until 2018

It was founded in 1786 and named after its founder, the army officer Ivan Abramovich Müller, who set up a farm estate after he received vacant land by the river deep in the Decree of the Empress Catherine the Great on February 14, 1786. At the end of the 19th century, it became an important railway hub.
Facilities were built to process a large part of agricultural products coming from the areas of the upper Don and Ukraine to send to the central provinces of Russia. It was granted town status in 1926.

During World War II, in July 1942, an encirclement of Soviet troops by Wehrmacht forces occurred around the town as part of the German Case Blue, resulting in around 50,000 Soviet soldiers being captured. Conversely, in December 1942 the Soviets encircled retreating German and Italian units under the command of General Hans Kreysing in the city. Millerovo was liberated on January 16, 1943, after the remaining Axis troops broke through the encirclement towards the west.

On 25 February 2022, during the Russian invasion of Ukraine, the Millerovo air base was reportedly hit by a Ukrainian Tochka-U missile. Neither the Ukrainian nor Russian authorities commented on the report.

== Administrative and municipal status ==
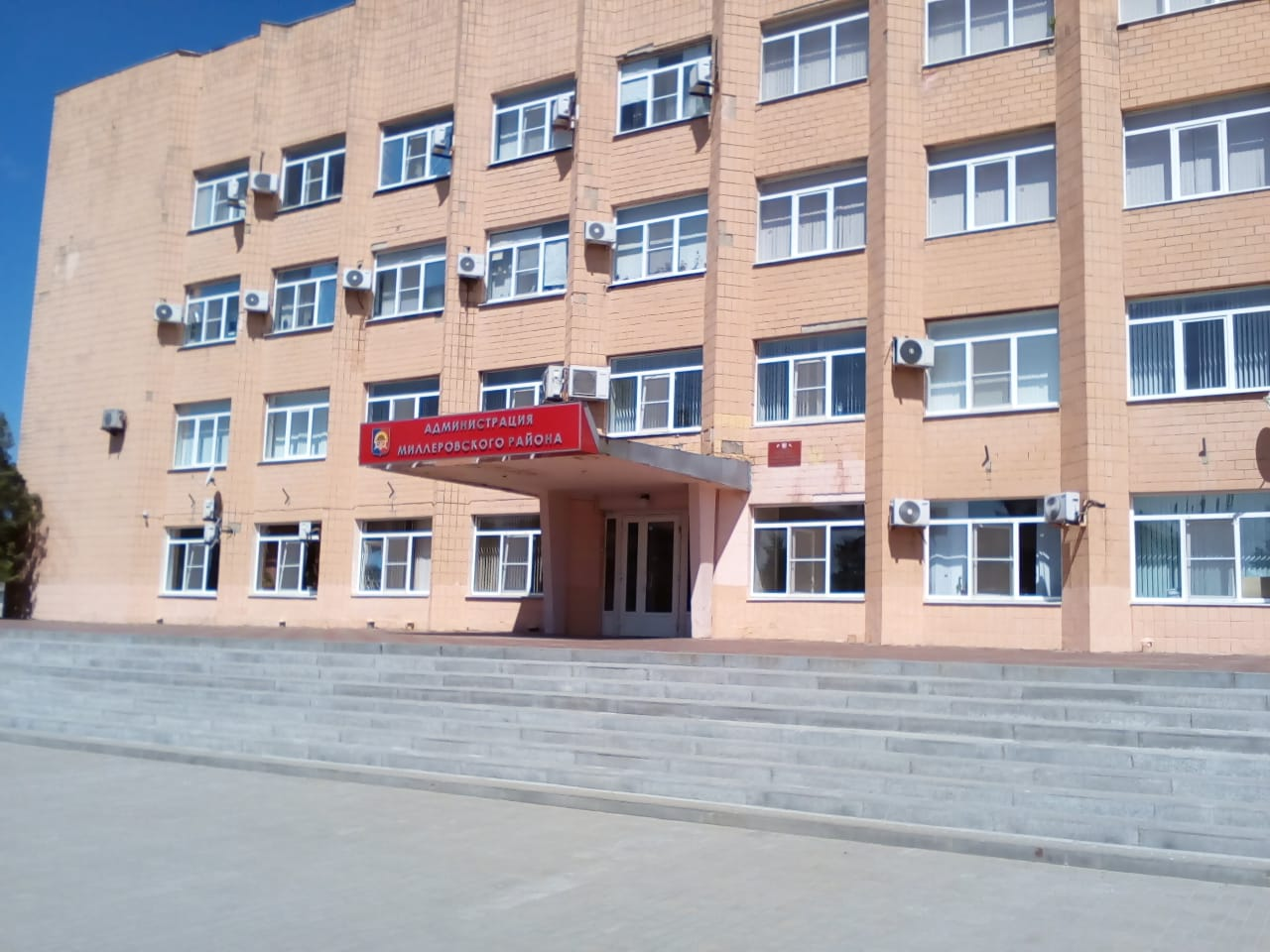
Millerovsky District administration building

Within the framework of administrative divisions, Millerovo serves as the administrative center of Millerovsky District. As an administrative division, it is incorporated within Millerovsky District as Millerovskoye Urban Settlement. As a municipal division, this administrative unit also has urban settlement status and is a part of Millerovsky Municipal District.

== Economy ==
The basis of the town's economy is food grain.

== Military ==
The Millerovo military airfield is located 5 kilometers (3.1 mi) northwest of the town. At the airfield was stationed the headquarters of the 16th Guards Fighter Aviation Division after its withdrawal from Germany in 1993 until 1998. Also until 2009, the 19th Nikopol Guards Fighter Aviation Regiment (19 Gv IAP)—a part of the 51st Air Defense Corps of the 4th Army of Air Force and Air Defense—was stationed there. The regiment was reorganized in 2009 as the 6969th Air Base, a part of the 7th Brigade of Military-Space Defense. MiG-29 fighters of both the former 19th GvIAP and the 31st Fighter Air Regiment, previously disbanded in Zernograd, are located at the airfield.

== Notable people ==
- Mira Żelechower-Aleksiun, Polish painter
- Denis Glushakov, footballer
