= KAB =

KAB or kab or variation, may refer to:

== Culture ==
- Kabyle language (ISO 639 language code kab; abbr. Kab), ISO code and common abbreviation
- An ancient Hebrew measure of capacity equal to about 1.4 liters
- Kab (month), the twelfth and last month of the Afghan calendar

== Groups, organizations, companies ==
- Kab Distribution Inc., Canadian media company
- Kent Association for the Blind, England, UK
- Kansas Association of Broadcasters, Kansas, USA
- Kumamoto Asahi Broadcasting, a television station in Kumamoto Prefecture, Japan
- Keep America Beautiful, USA; a non-profit for litter prevention and community improvement
- Kabale University (KAB), Uganda

== People ==
- Ka'b (name), an Arab and Islamic male given name, surname, and patronymic; including a list of people
- Vyto Kab (born 1959), U.S. American football player

== Places ==
- El Kab (Ancient Egyptian: Nekheb, Ancient Greek: Eileithyias polis), an archaeological site in Egypt

== Other uses ==
- Kyle Afferent Body (KAB), a fictional element of the Rhon psions from Saga of the Skolian Empire
- "KAB-" (Russian: "КАБ-" (Корректируемые Авиационные Бомбы, romanized: Korrektiruyemyye Aviatsionnye Bomby) (Correctable Aviation Bombs), prefix for Russian precision-guided munitions
  - KAB-1500
  - KAB-1500KR
  - KAB-1500L
  - KAB-1500S-E
  - KAB-20
  - KAB-250
  - KAB-250LG-E
  - KAB-250S-E
  - KAB-500
  - KAB-500KR
  - KAB-500L
  - KAB-500OD
  - KAB-500S-E

== See also ==
- Kab 101, an oil platform
- Kab-kab
- KABB
- Kaab (disambiguation)
- Khab (disambiguation)
- Cab (disambiguation)
