= General-purpose bomb =

Air dropped bomb used for multiple purposes

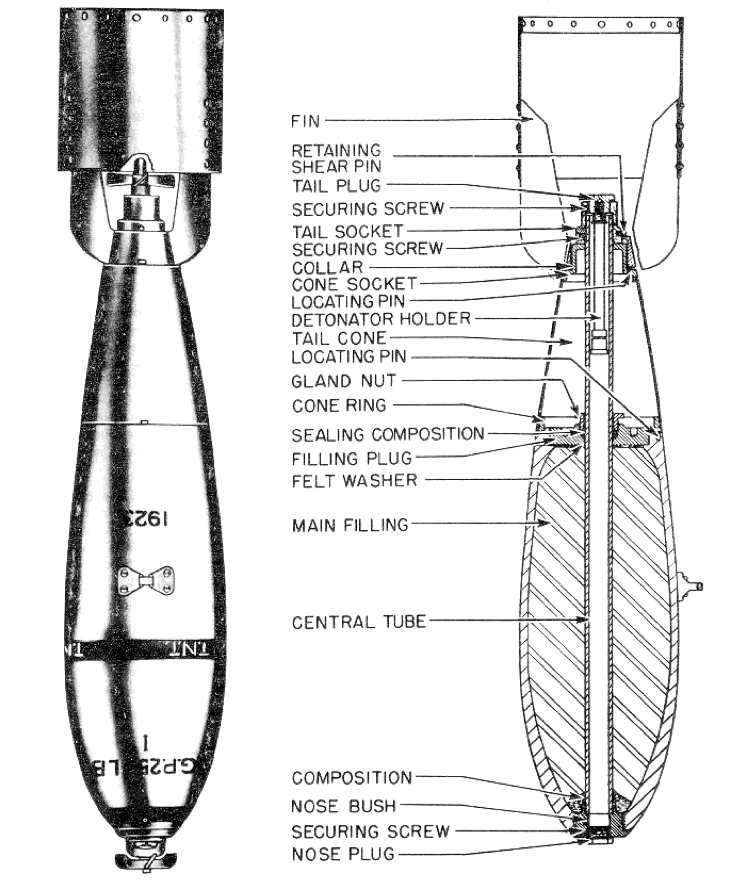
Diagram of a British, 250 lb General-Purpose Bomb Mark 1, used during the early part of World War 2

A general-purpose bomb is an air-dropped bomb intended as a compromise between blast damage, penetration, and fragmentation in explosive effect. They are designed to be effective against enemy troops, vehicles, and buildings.

== Characteristics ==
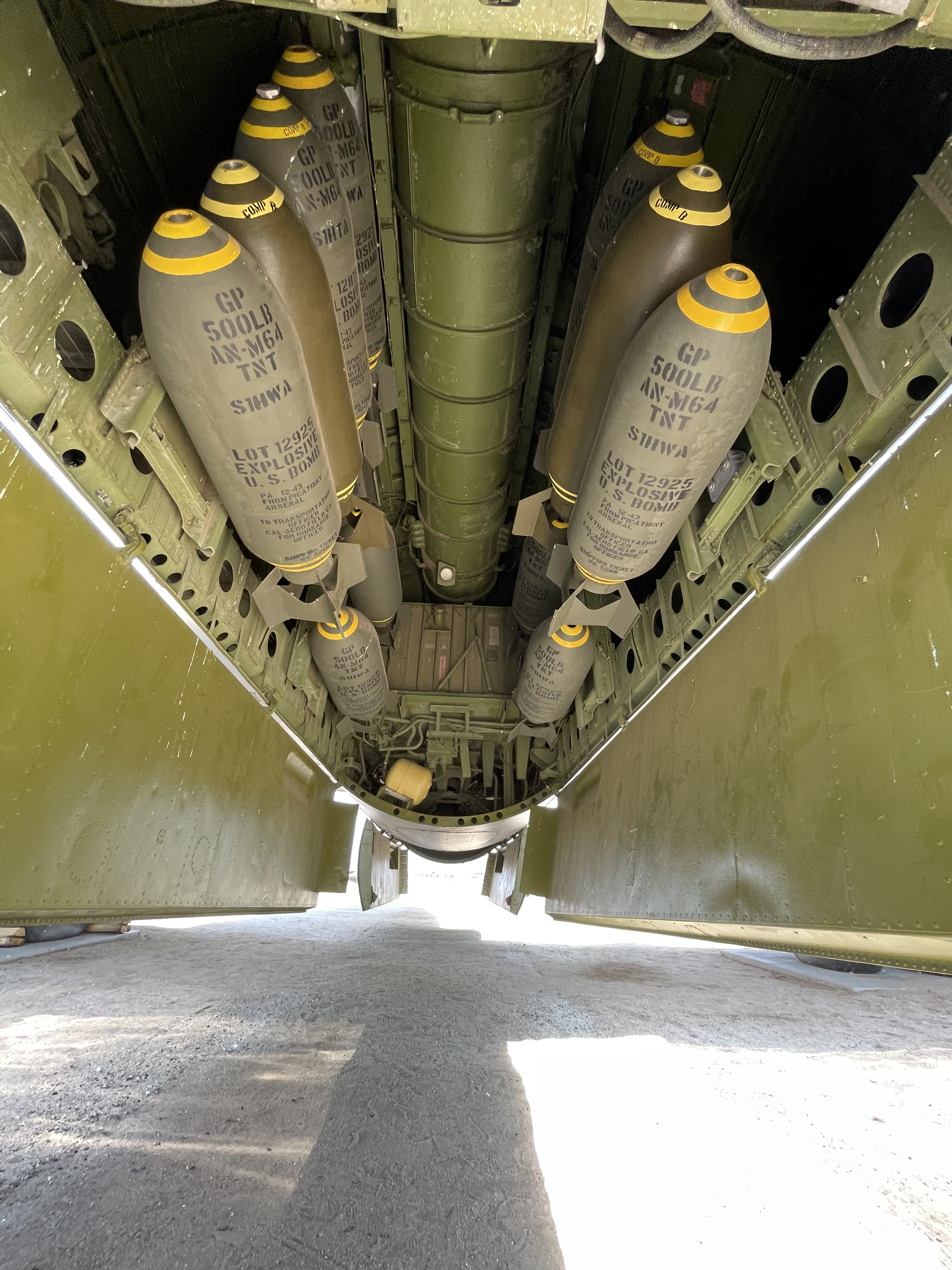
American AN-M64 500-lb general-purpose bomb in Boeing B-29 Superfortress weapons bay

General-purpose (GP) bombs use a thick-walled metal casing with explosive filler (typically TNT, Composition B, or Tritonal in NATO or United States service) comprising about 30% to 40% of the bomb's total weight. The British term for a bomb of this type is "medium case" or "medium capacity" (MC). The GP bomb is a common weapon of fighter bomber and attack aircraft because it is useful for a variety of tactical applications and relatively cheap.

General-purpose bombs are often identified by their weight (e.g., 500 lb or 230 kg). In many cases this is strictly a nominal weight (the counterpart to the caliber of a firearm), and the actual weight of each individual weapon may vary depending on its retardation, fusing, carriage, and guidance systems. For example, the actual weight of a U.S. M117 bomb, nominally 750 lb (340 kg), is typically around 820 lb (370 kg).

Most modern air-dropped GP bombs are designed to minimize drag for external carriage on aircraft lacking bomb bays.

In low-altitude attacks, there is a danger of the attacking aircraft being caught in the blast of its own weapons. To address this problem, GP bombs are often fitted with retarders, parachutes or pop-out fins that slow the bomb's descent to allow the aircraft time to escape the detonation.

GP bombs can be fitted with a variety of fuzes and fins for different uses. One notable example is the "daisy cutter" fuze used in Vietnam War era American weapons, an extended probe designed to ensure that the bomb would detonate on contact (even with foliage) rather than burying itself in earth or mud, which would reduce its effectiveness. (This was not the first instance of such devices. As early as World War II, the Luftwaffe was using extended-nose fuzes on bombs dropped by Stuka dive-bombers and other aircraft for exactly the same reason. A blast several feet above the ground is many times more effective and has a far greater radius than one that is delayed until the bomb is below the surface.)

GP bombs are commonly used as the warheads for more sophisticated precision-guided munitions. Using various types of seeker and electrically controlled fins turns a basic 'iron' bomb into a laser-guided bomb (like the U.S. Paveway series), an electro-optical guided bomb, or, more recently, GPS-guided weapon (like the U.S. JDAM). The combination is cheaper than a true guided missile (and can be more easily upgraded or replaced in service), but is substantially more accurate than an unguided bomb.

== Historical examples ==
=== WWII-era British ===
During WWII the British adopted a description of general-purpose bombs as medium capacity (MC) bombs. The 1,000 lb (450 kg) MC was developed from 1942 to replace the existing 1000 lb GP (General Purpose) bomb. Initially using most of the components of the 1000 lb GP it was decided to give it a new tail and it was built with a half-inch-thick wall. Fillings could be Amatex, Amatol, Minol, RDX and others. Actual weight was around 1,020 lb (460 kg). It was introduced to service in 1943 and about a quarter of a million were produced by the end of the war.

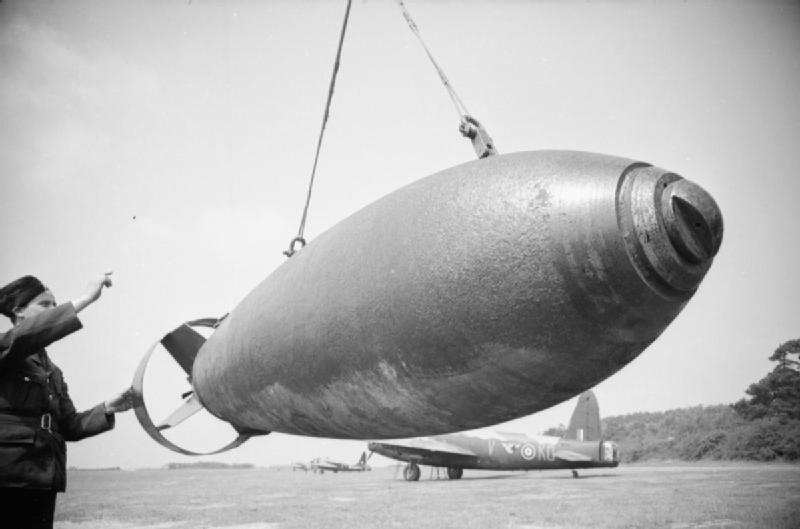
A 4000 lb GP bomb, 1943

- 40 lb (18 kg) General-Purpose bomb – produced 1937 to 1941
- 50 lb (23 kg) General-Purpose Bomb – not produced
- 120 lb (54 kg) General-Purpose Bomb – abandoned project
- 250 lb (110 kg) General-Purpose Bomb (1926 onwards) – replaced by 250 lb MC in 1942
- 500 lb (230 kg) General-Purpose Bomb (1926 onwards) – replaced by 500 lb MC in 1942
- 1,000 lb (450 kg) General-Purpose Bomb (1939 onwards) – replaced by 1000 lb MC in 1943
- 1,900 lb (860 kg) General-Purpose Bomb (1941 onwards)
- 4,000 lb (1,800 kg) General-Purpose Bomb (1943) – replaced by 4000 lb HC

== Modern ==
=== American: the Mark 80 series ===
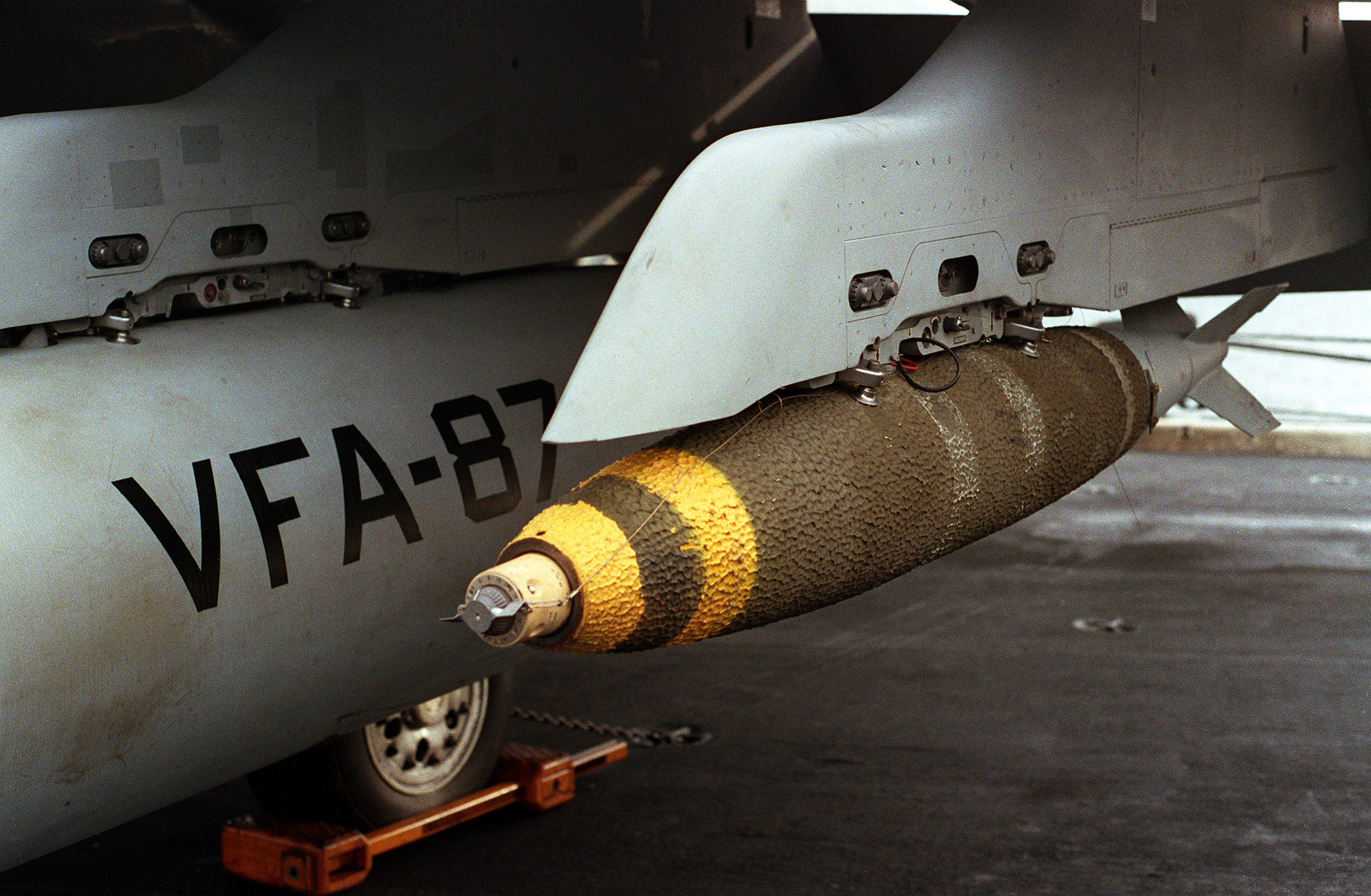
A Mk 82 GP bomb loaded on an F/A-18 Hornet, showing nose fuze and textured thermal insulation

During the Korean War and Vietnam War the U.S. used older designs like the M65, M117 and M118, which had an explosive content about 65% higher than most contemporary weapons. Although some of these weapons remain in the U.S. arsenal, they are little used.

The primary U.S. GP bombs are the Mark 80 series. This class of weapons uses a shape known as Aero 1A, designed by Ed Heinemann of Douglas Aircraft as the result of studies in 1946. It has a length-to-diameter ratio of about 8:1, and results in minimal drag for the carrier aircraft. The Mark 80 series was not used in combat until the Vietnam War, but has since replaced most earlier GP weapons. It includes four basic weapon types:

- Mark 81 – nominal weight 250 pounds (113 kg)
- Mark 82 – nominal weight 500 pounds (227 kg)
- Mark 83 – nominal weight 1,000 pounds (454 kg)
- Mark 84 – nominal weight 2,000 pounds (907 kg)

Vietnam service showed the Mk 81 "Firecracker" to be sub par, and it was withdrawn from U.S. service. However, recently, precision-guided variants of the Mk 81 bomb have begun a return to service, based on U.S. experience in Iraq after 2003, and the desire to reduce collateral damage compared to Mk 82 and larger bombs (e.g., when attacking a single small building in a populated area).

Since the Vietnam War and the 1967 USS Forrestal fire, United States Navy and United States Marine Corps GP bombs are distinguished by a thick ablative fire-retardant coating, which is designed to delay any potential accidental explosion in the event of a shipboard fire. Land-based air forces typically do not use such coatings, largely because they add some 30 lb (14 kg) to the weight of the complete weapon. Fire is less a danger in a land-based facility, where the personnel can be evacuated with relative ease, and the building be the only loss. At sea, the crew and munitions share a facility (the ship), and thus are in much more danger of fire reaching munitions (which tend to be more closely packed, due to space limitations). Also, losing a munitions storage building on land is far cheaper than sacrificing an entire naval vessel, even if one could easily evacuate the crew.

All Mk 80 bombs have both nose and tail fuze wells and can accept a variety of fuzes. Various nose and tail kits can be fitted to adapt the weapon for a variety of roles.

Mk 80 series bomb bodies are also used in the following weapons:

- BDU-50 A practice (no explosive) version of the Mk 82 bomb body
- BDU-56 A practice (no explosive) version of the Mk 84 bomb body

On August 14, 2020, Kaman Precision Products received roughly $57.3 million for a "cockpit-selectable" bomb fuze to be used on Mark 80 warheads (guided and unguided). The contract involved foreign military sales (FMS) to 25 unnamed countries.

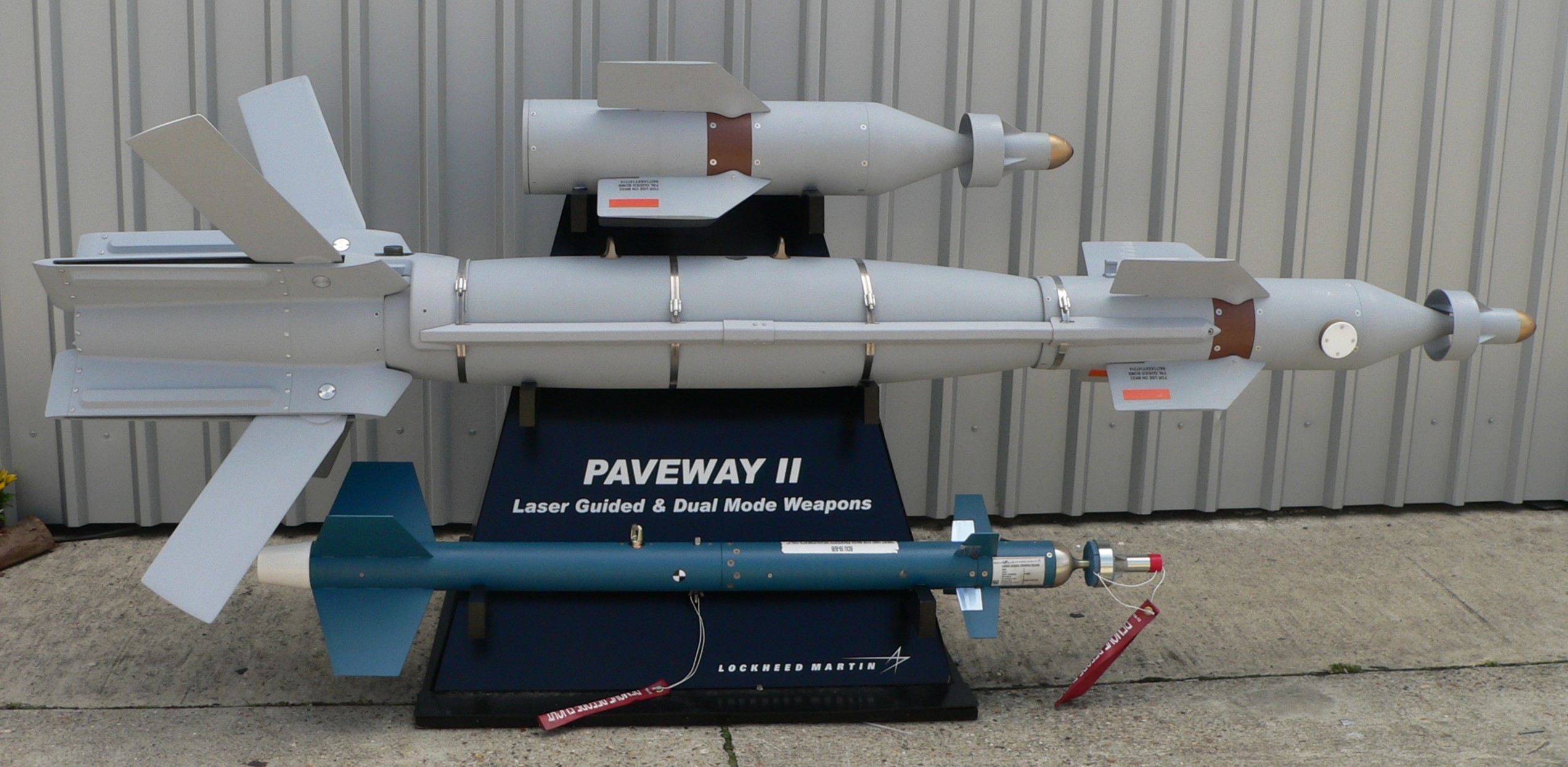
Guidance accessories for a 500 lb body and a Laser-Guided Training Round, bottom

==== Smart bomb kits ====
Dumb Mk 80 bombs could be converted to smart bombs with attached kits:

- GBU-12D Paveway II (Mk 82) laser-guided
- GBU-16B Paveway II (Mk 83) laser-guided
- GBU-24B Paveway III (Mk 84) laser-guided
- GBU-38 JDAM (Mk 82) INS/GPS guided
- GBU-32 JDAM (Mk 83) INS/GPS guided
- GBU-31 JDAM (Mk 84) INS/GPS guided
- GBU-X - a guided general-purpose bomb under development as of 2017

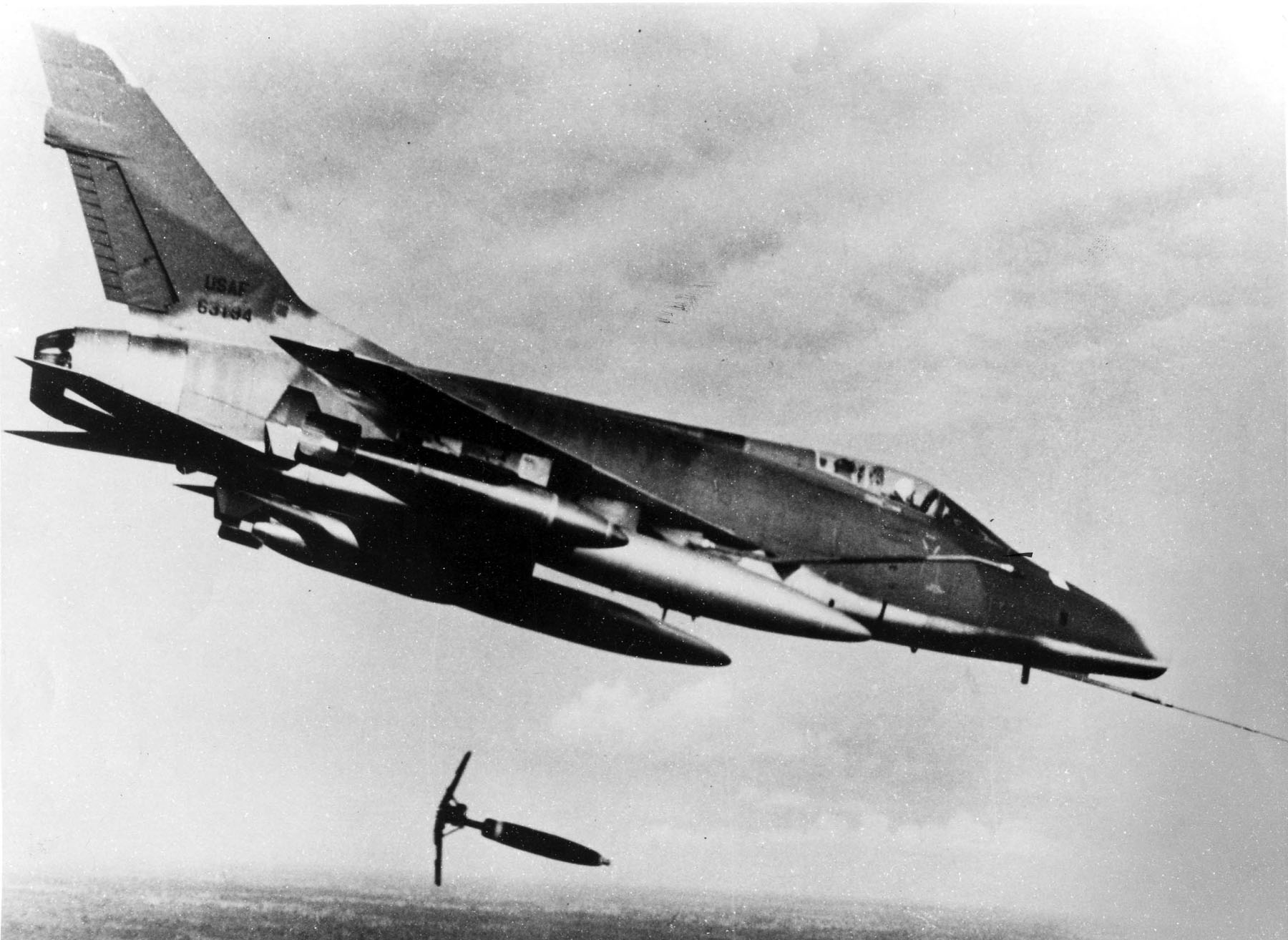
Snake Eye

==== Retarded (high drag) versions ====
- Mk 82 Snake Eye was a standard Mk 82 with folded retarding petals.
- Mk 82 Retarded was a standard Mk 82 with a ballute.
- Mk 83 Retarded was a standard Mk 83 with a ballute.
- Mk 84 Retarded was a standard Mk 84 with a ballute.

The retarder is used to allow the aircraft escape the "blast pattern" in low altitude delivery.

=== British ===
The principal modern British bombs are 540 lb (240 kg) and 1,000 lb (450 kg), and are no longer in service. The smaller 540 lb was retired with the demise of the Harrier GR9 aircraft with the larger 1000 lb being retired in Apr 2019. Currently the UK only uses the 500 lb class Paveway IV weapon system. The warhead is a modified enhanced Mk 82 warhead.

=== Soviet and Russian ===
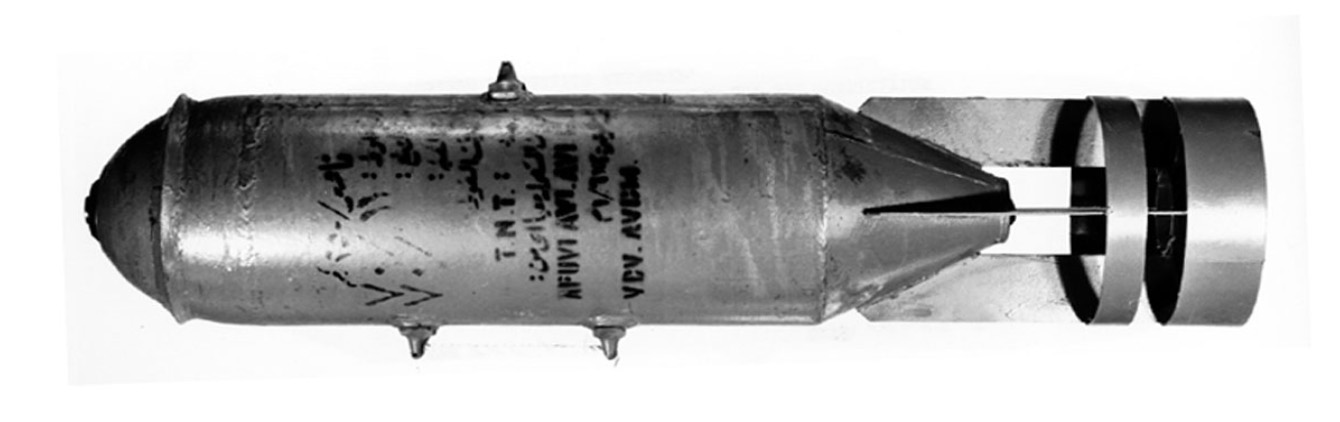
A 1946 FAB-250 bomb

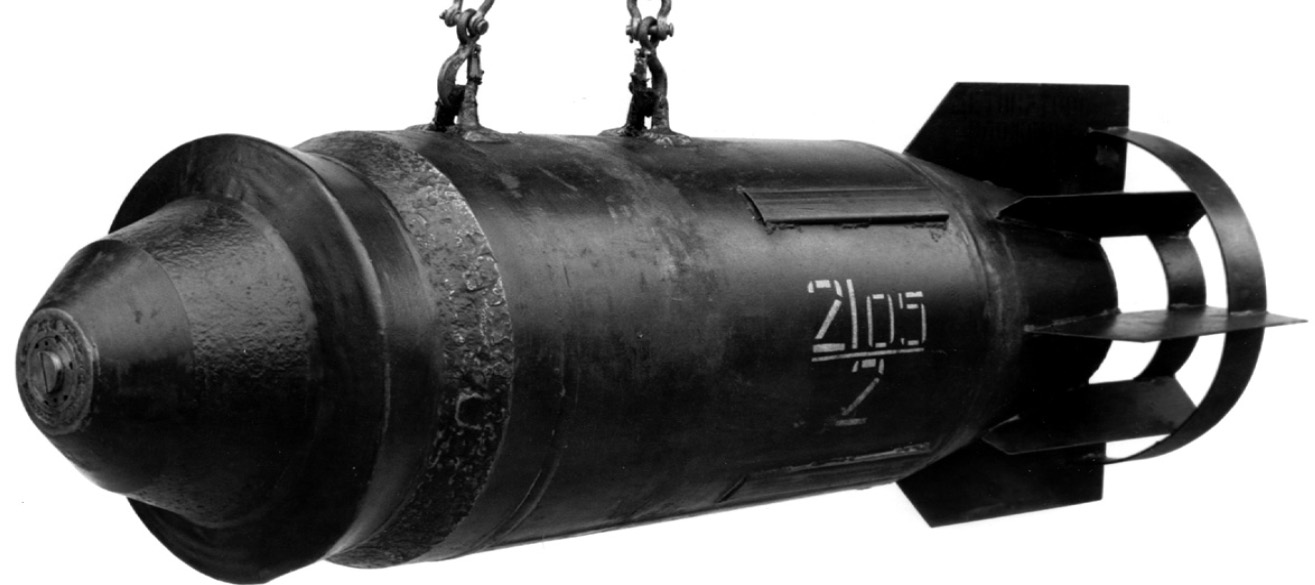
A 1954 FAB-500 bomb

The Russian term for general-purpose bomb is fugasnaya aviatsionnaya bomba (FAB) and followed by the bomb's nominal weight in kilograms. Most Russian iron bombs have circular ring airfoils rather than the fins used by Western types.

In 1946 the Soviet Union developed a series of freefall bombs in four sizes 550 lb (250 kg), 1,100 lb (500 kg), 3,300 lb (1,500 kg), and 6,600 lb (3,000 kg) and sharing a single nose and a single tail fuze. The bomb could be dropped from up to 39,000 ft (12,000 m) and up to 620 mph (1,000 km/h). The original, 1946-series bombs had poor ballistic characteristics at supersonic speed, and their construction was fragile. As an interim measure, upgraded versions of the bombs were built with thicker walls and no nose fuze. The thick-walled version of the bombs was built until 1956.

The 1954 series of high-drag bombs was built in six sizes: 550 lb (250 kg), 1,100 lb (500 kg), 3,300 lb (1,500 kg), 6,600 lb (3,000 kg), 11,000 lb (5,000 kg), and 20,000 lb (9,000 kg). A feature of the 1954 series of bombs is the ballistic ring on the nose of the bomb which acts as a vortex generator to aid the bomb's stabilizers. The smaller (less than 6,600 lb or 3,000 kg) bombs had a single nose and a single tail fuze, while the larger weapons shared a single nose fuze and two base fuzes. The FAB-9000 (20,000 lb or 9,000 kg) weapon was roughly comparable to the wartime Grand Slam bomb. It was used by Soviet aircraft designers as a substitute for early nuclear weapons when determining the size and clearances of bomb bays.

In 1962 a new series of streamlined, low-drag bombs was introduced, designed for external carriage by fighter-bomber aircraft rather than in internal bays. They come in only two sizes, 550 lb (250 kg) and 1,100 lb (500 kg). Both bombs have a single nose fuze.

Both the 54 and 62 series designs remain in use. The most common of these are the FAB-100, FAB-250, FAB-500, and FAB-1500, roughly corresponding to the U.S. Mark 80 series. These have seen widespread service in Russia, Warsaw Pact nations, and various export countries.

Larger bombs with less streamlined shapes also remained in the Soviet arsenal, primarily for use by heavy bombers. In the Iran–Iraq War, FAB-5000 (11,000 lb or 5,000 kg) and FAB-9000 (20,000 lb or 9,000 kg) bombs were dropped by Iraqi Air Force Tupolev Tu-22 bombers, generally against large, fixed targets in Iran. In Afghanistan in the 1980s, Soviet Tupolev Tu-16 and Tupolev Tu-22M bombers used massive FAB-1500, FAB-3000, FAB-5000NG, and FAB-9000 bombs to devastating effect during the Panjshir offensives. More recently, many Russian FAB-500 and FAB-1500 general-purpose bombs were converted to precision munitions through the addition of mass-produced so-called UMPK kits, which add battery-powered electrically actuated pop-out wings and flight control surfaces as well as guidance electronics, all of whose addition turns unguided gravity bombs into smart bombs with a glide ratio comparable to that of the Space Shuttle.

On 20 June 2024, Russia claimed that it used, for the first time, a FAB-3000 modified with a guidance wing kit near Lyptsi in Kharkiv Oblast. Russian media claimed that it was aimed at Ukrainian soldiers, Ukraine claimed that it narrowly missed a hospital. Russia announced that it was restarting production of the FAB-3000 in March 2024. More purported uses of the bomb in the same region took place in the next days with videos appeared online. The Russian Ministry of Defense officially announced the use of the bomb on 14 July 2024 by publishing a video which showed an Su-34 tactical bomber launching it.

- FAB-100
- FAB-250M-54
- KhAB-250, KhAB-500
- IAB-500 (inert training); other = liquid fuel phosphorus incendiary
- FAB-500 (F = HE); FAB-500M-54, FAB-500M-62
- FAB-1500
- FAB-3000
- various nuclear ABs
- ZAB (Z = incendiary), P-50T (smoke/incendiary);
- FZAB; OFZAB, OZAB
- ODAB (OD = vacuum)
- OFAB, OAB (oskolochno = fragmentation)
- DAB (smoke), SAB = flare or free fall HE
- BetAB (concrete-piercing), BrAB (armour-piercing); PTAB (AT)
- RBK
- LAB (laser), UAB & UPAB (guided), IKAB TAB (thermal IR) TelAB (cam)
- KAB-250, KAB-250S-E, KAB-250LG-E
- KAB-500L (K = correction of trajectory) guided, KAB-500Kr
- KAB-1500Kr, KAB-1500L
- PBK-500U Drel
- ODAB-500PM
- AVBPM

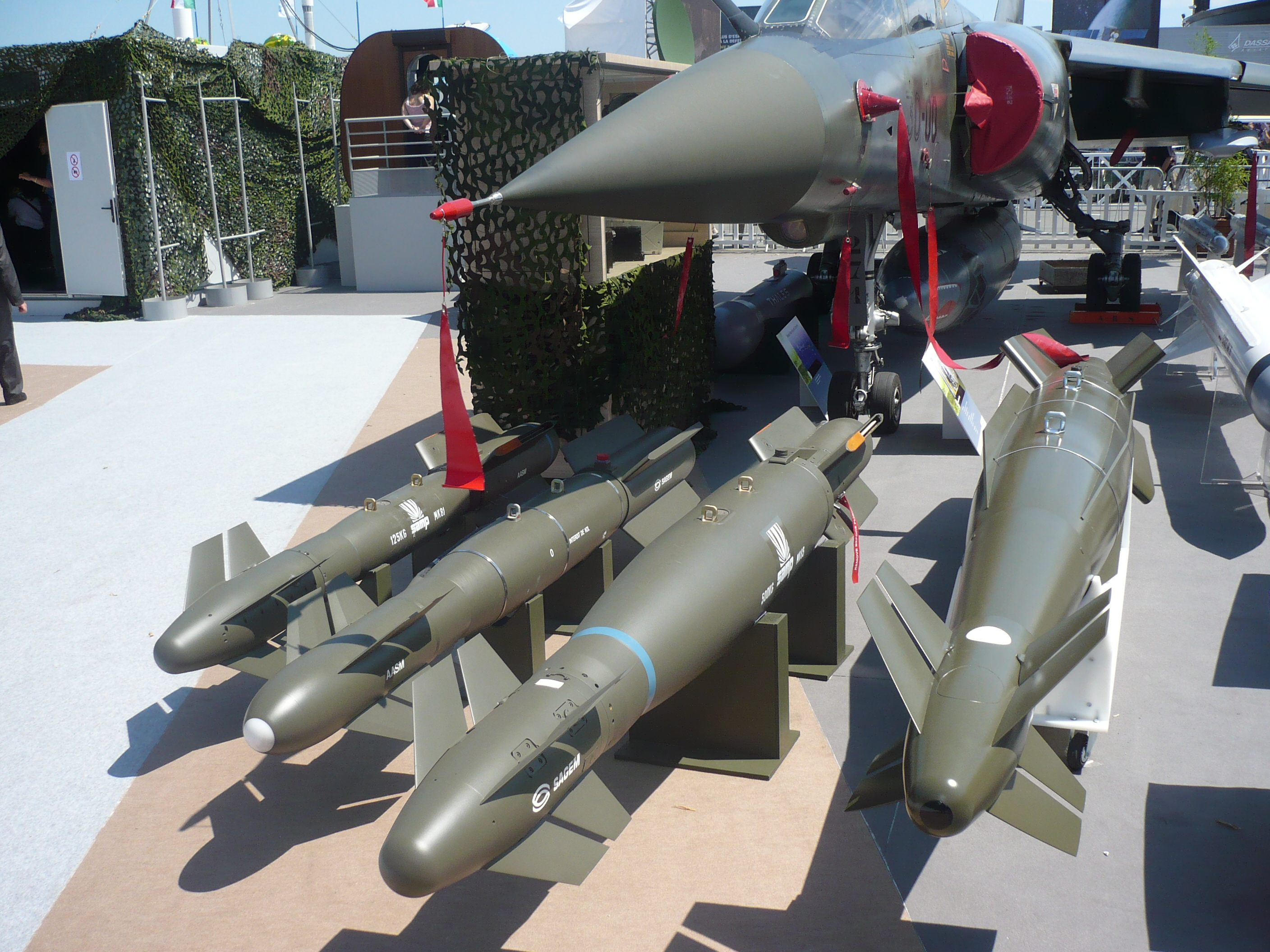
French-built Mark 80 bombs equipped with AASM guidance and range extension kits

=== French ===
France produces or has produced numerous types of general-purpose bombs with weights ranging from 50 kg (110 lb) to 1,000 kg (2,200 lb), including US Mark 80 models.

Until 2011, bomb casings were made by the Société des Ateliers Mécaniques de Pont-sur-Sambre. The acronym “SAMP” identifies these bombs, along with various type codes such as EU2 and T200. Since 2019, bomb casings are made at a new factory in Rouvignies and are filled with explosives at another factory in Sorgues.

=== Indian ===
India's Defence Research and Development Organisation (DRDO) has developed the High Speed Low Drag Bomb or HSLD series of general-purpose bombs. Size variations of these bombs are 100 kg (220 lb), 250 kg (550 lb), 450 kg (990 lb) and 500 kg (1,100 lb). The 450 kg and 500 kg bombs have precision-guided versions as well. The bombs are manufactured by Munitions India Limited.

=== Other nations ===
Other countries, including Australia, Azerbaijan, Brazil, Chile, Greece, Israel, Italy, Pakistan, Poland, Portugal, Romania, South Africa, Spain, Sweden, and Turkey, manufacture their own bombs, most of which are either licensed versions of the U.S. Mark 80 series or close copies.

== See also ==
- Unguided bomb
- Blockbuster bomb – chosen for blast effect
