= List of munitions used by the Egyptian Air Force =

This List of Munitions of the Egyptian Air Force lists the missiles, bombs and related equipment in use by the Egyptian Air Force.

== List ==
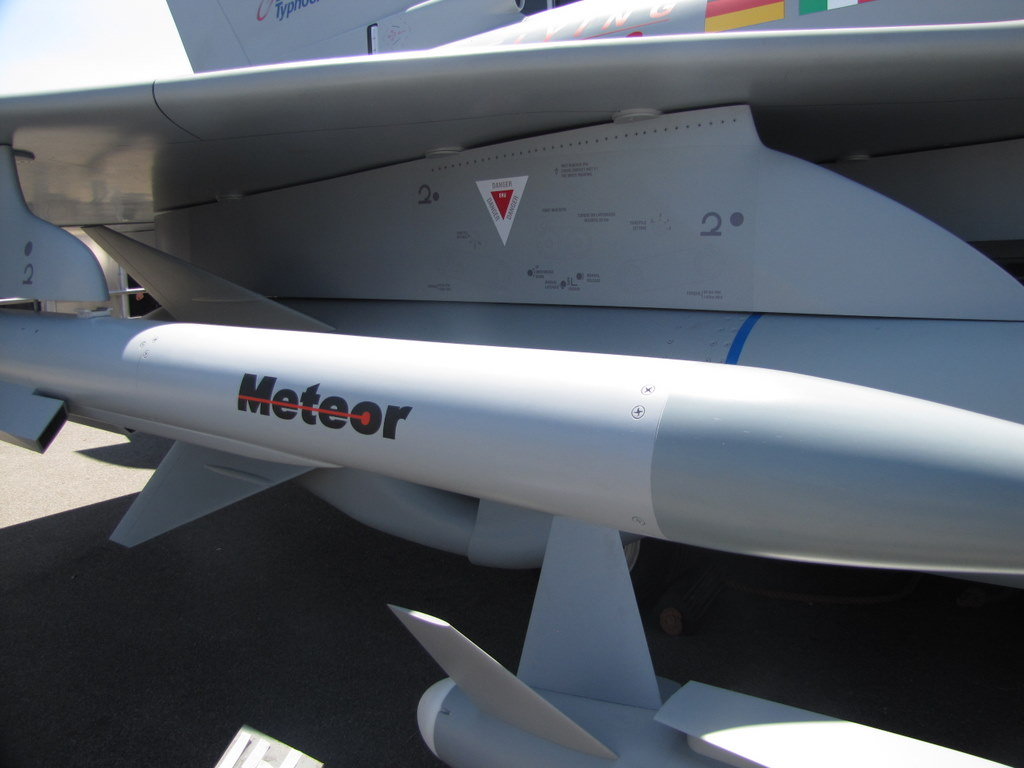
METEOR

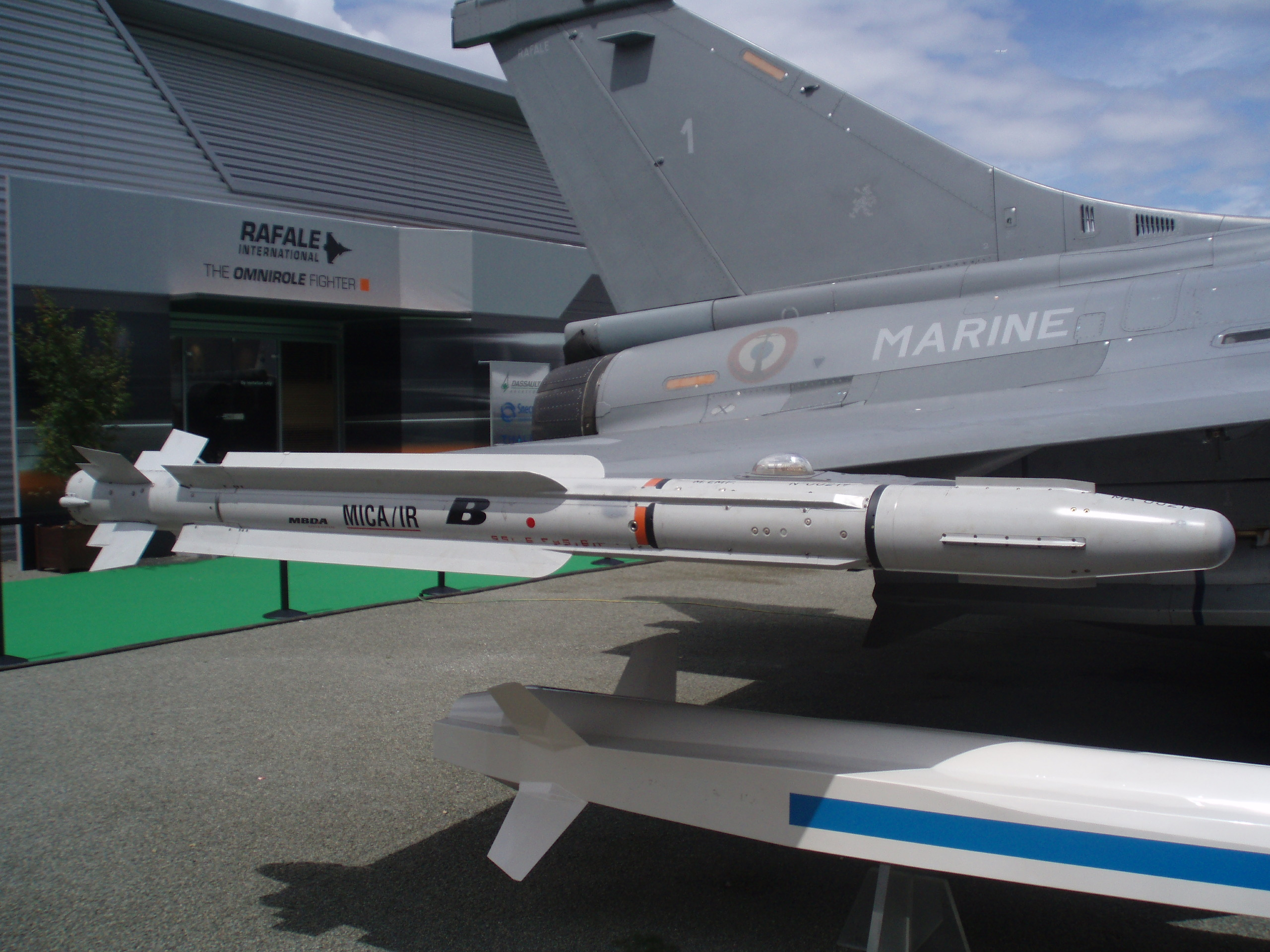
MICA

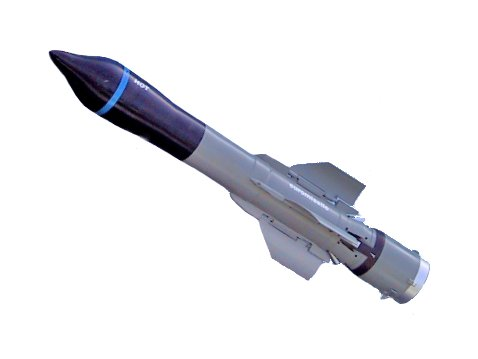
HOT

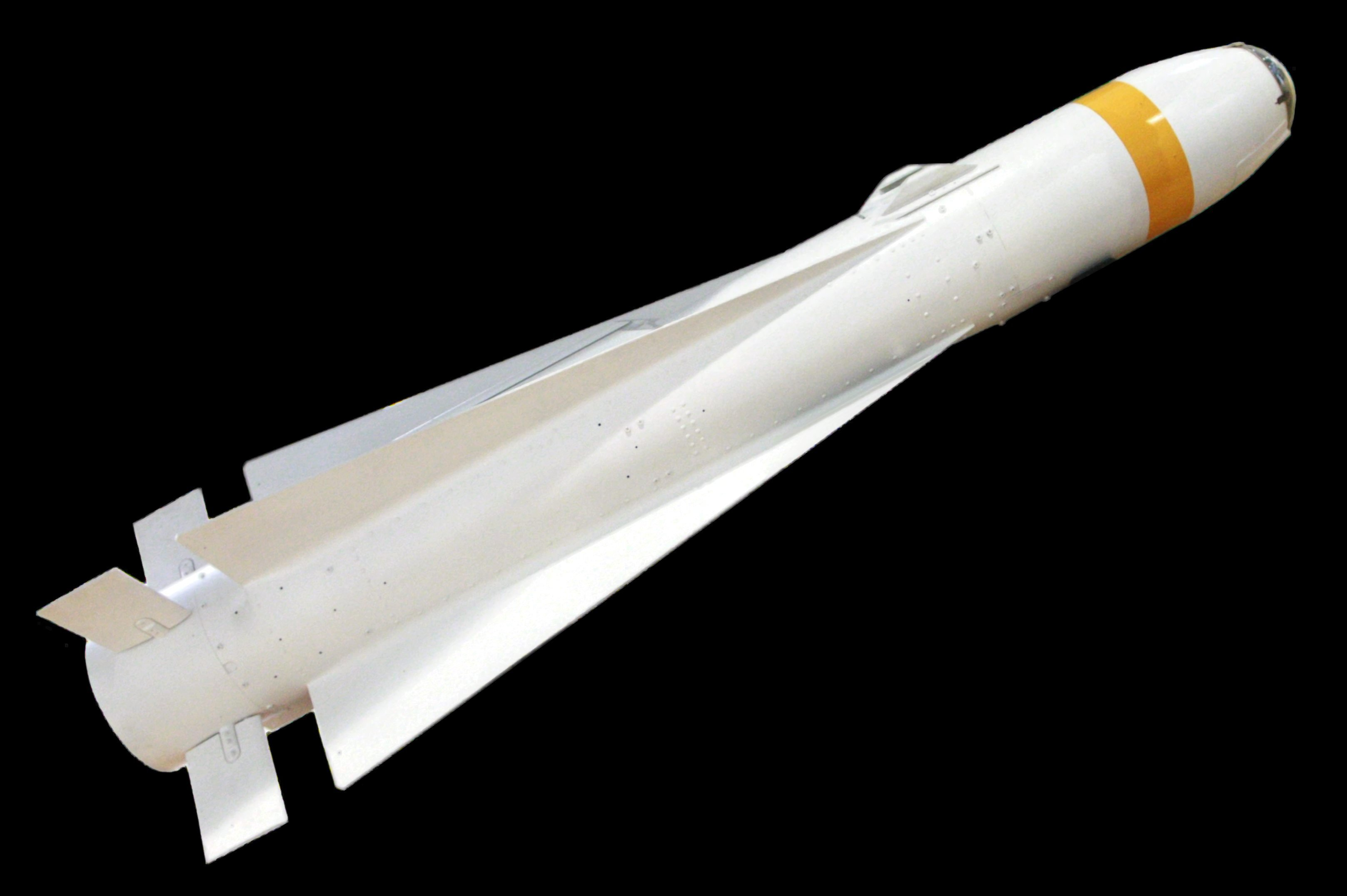
AGM-65 Maverick

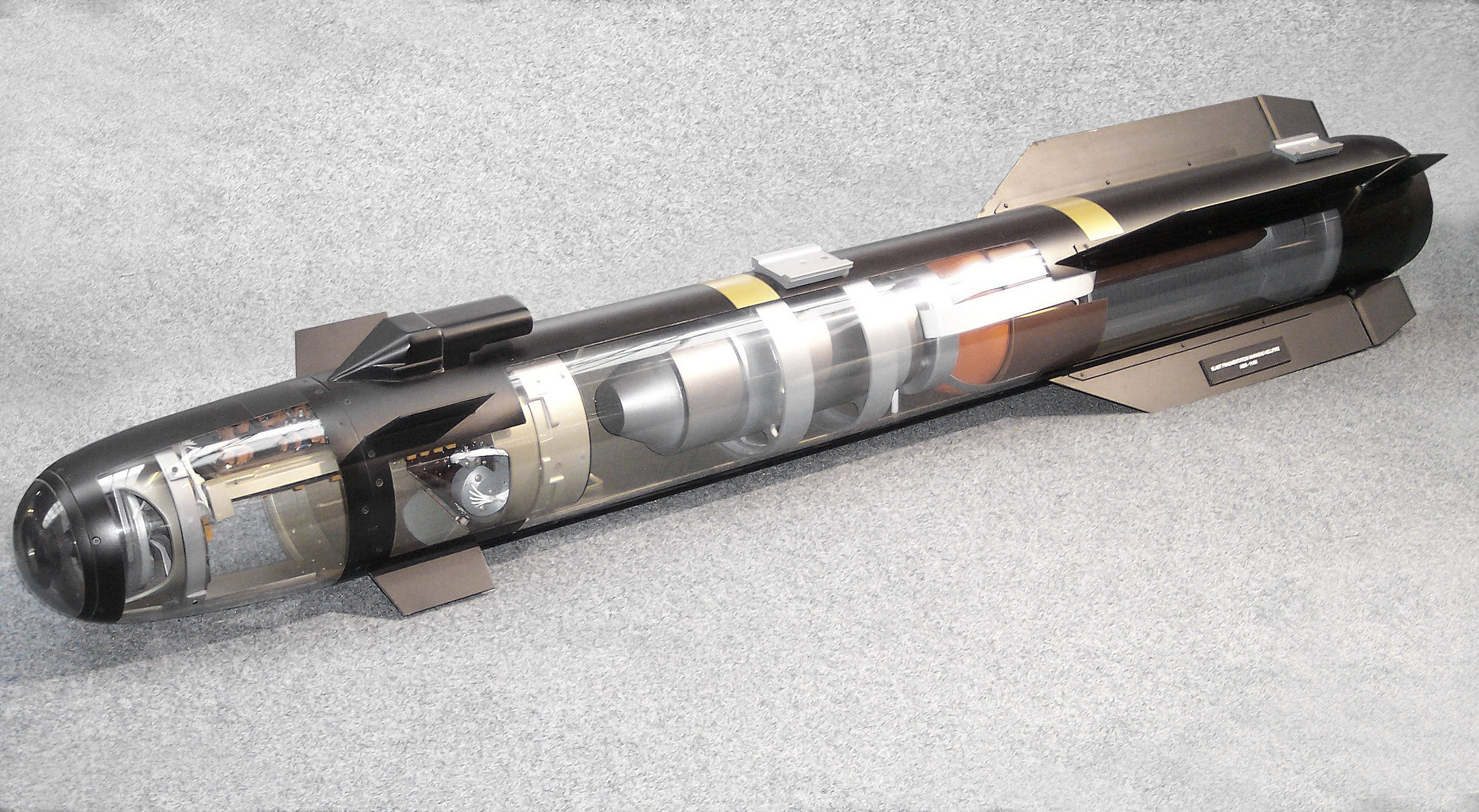
AGM-114 Hellfire

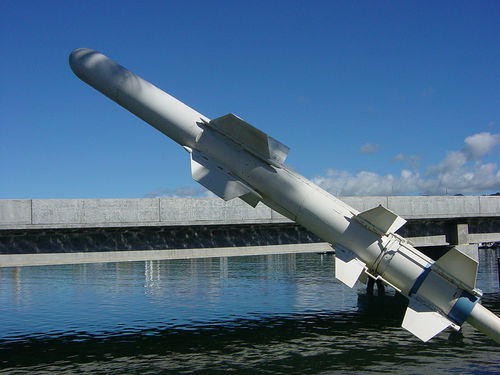
Harpoon

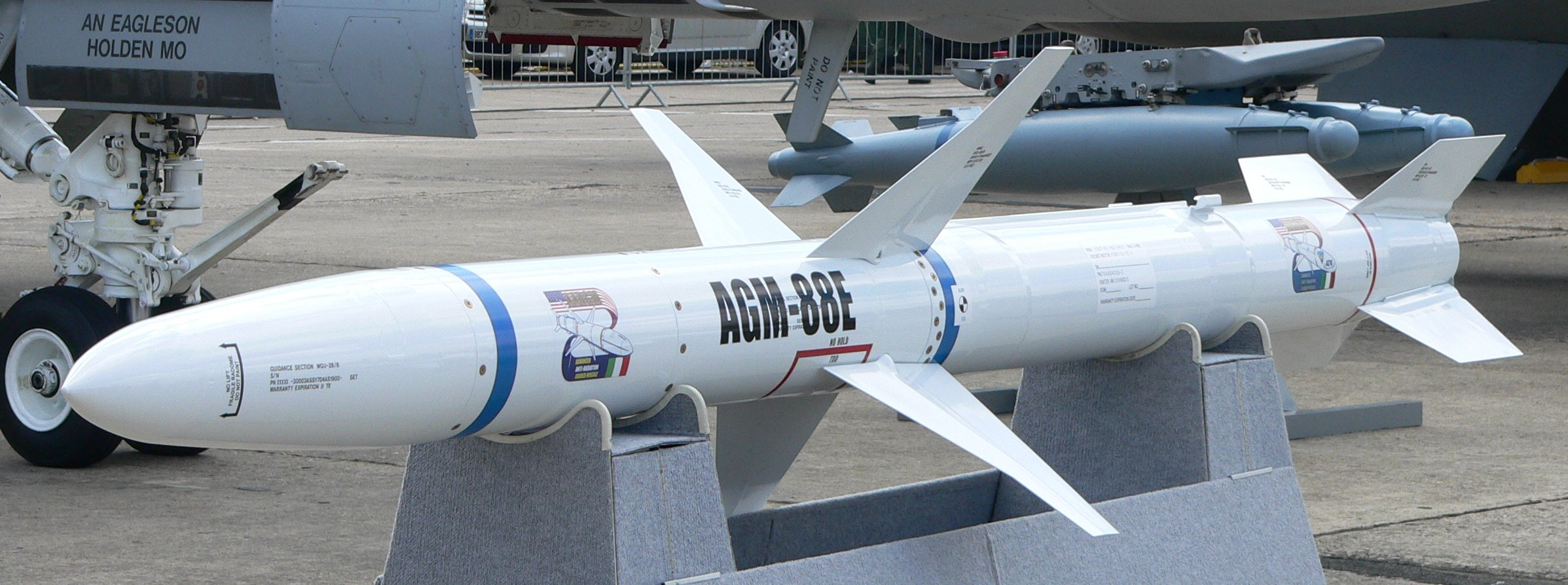
AGM-88 HARM

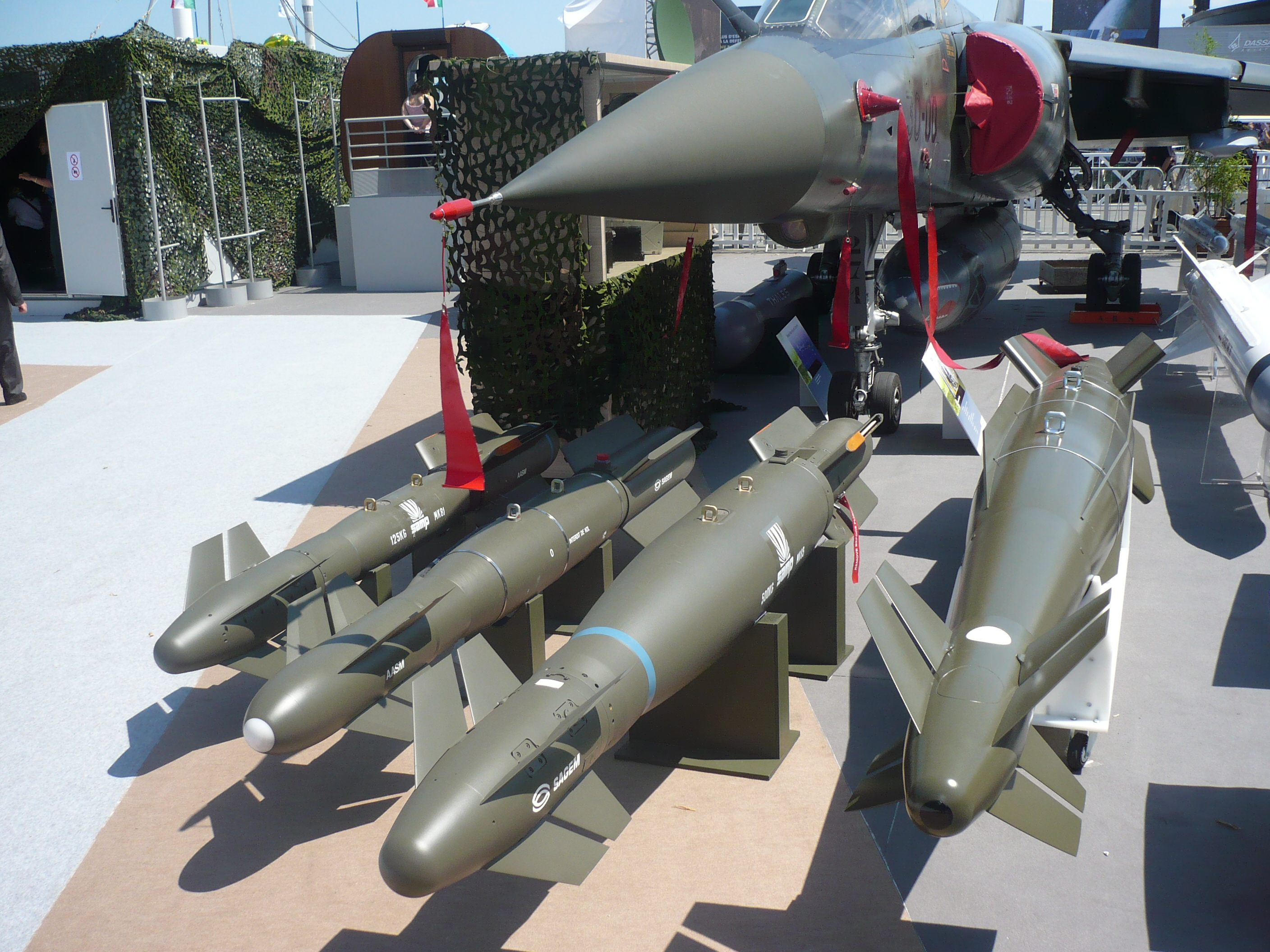
AASM

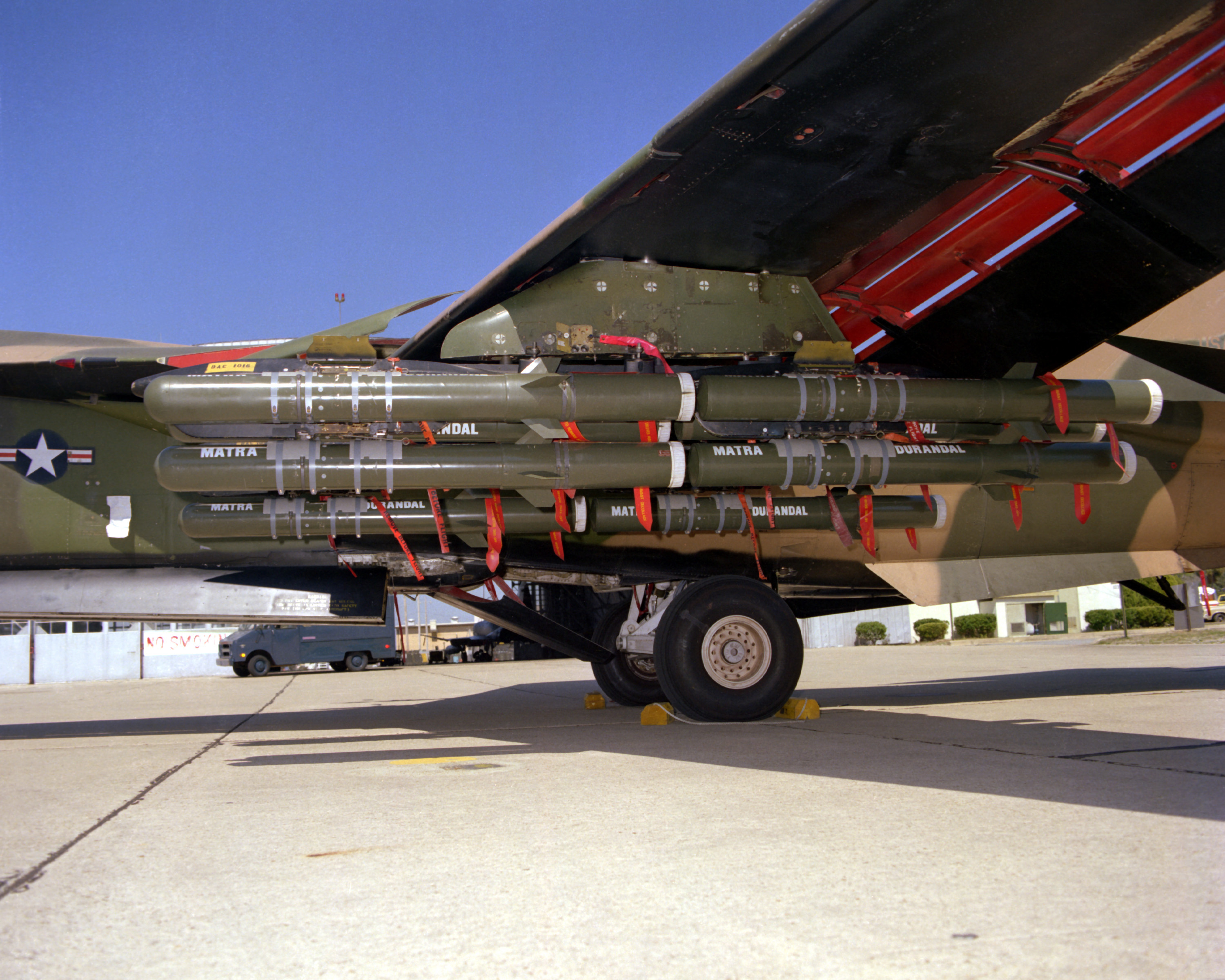
Matra Durandal

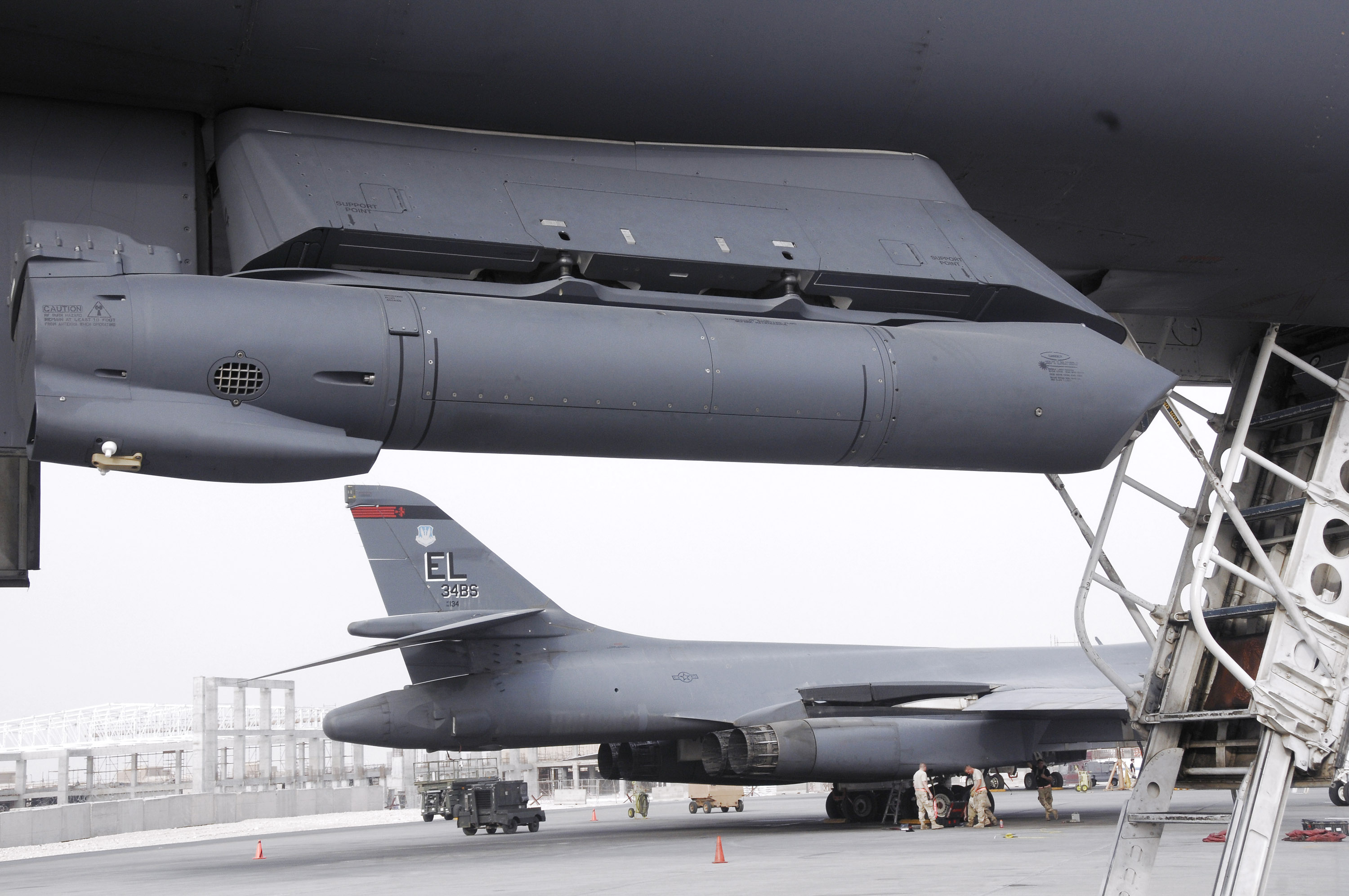
A Sniper Advanced Targeting Pod hangs from the underbelly of a B-1B Lancer

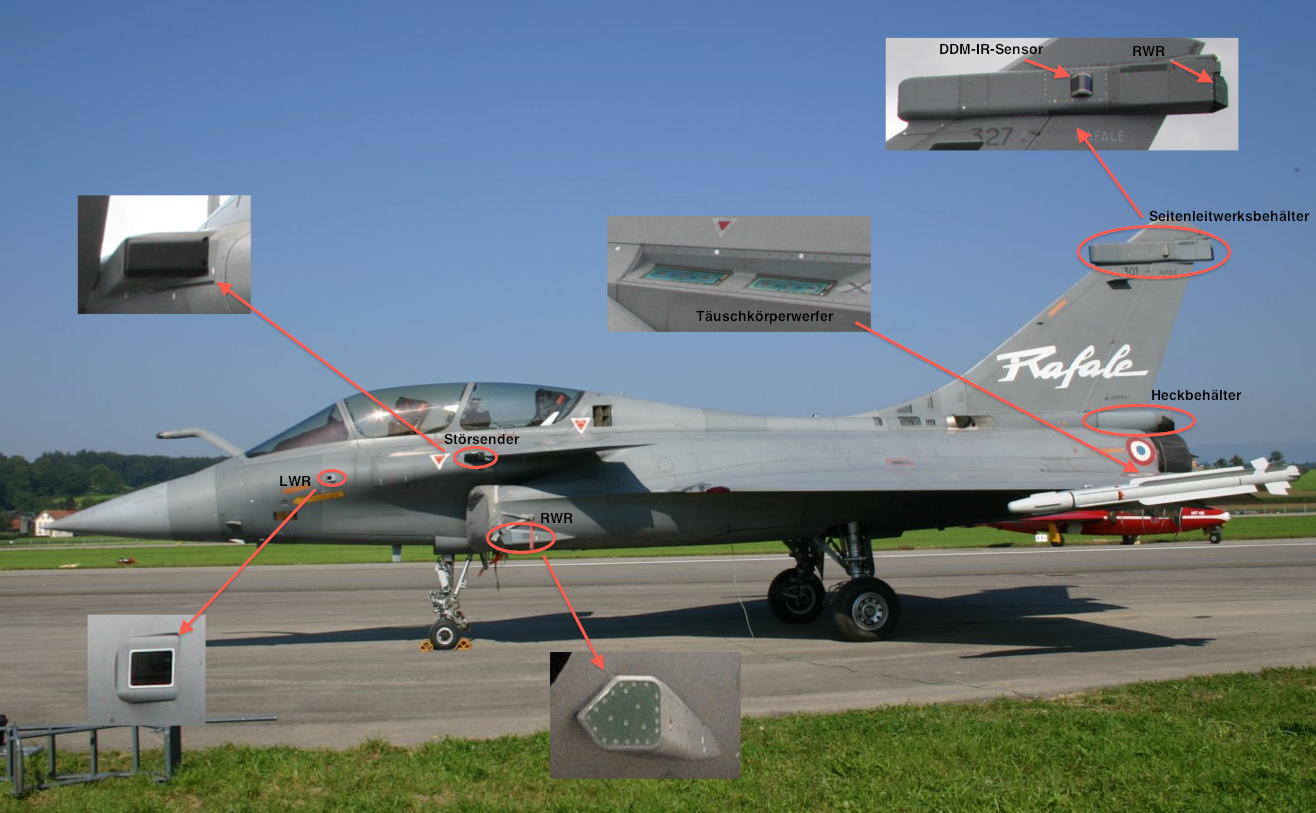
Thales Spectra

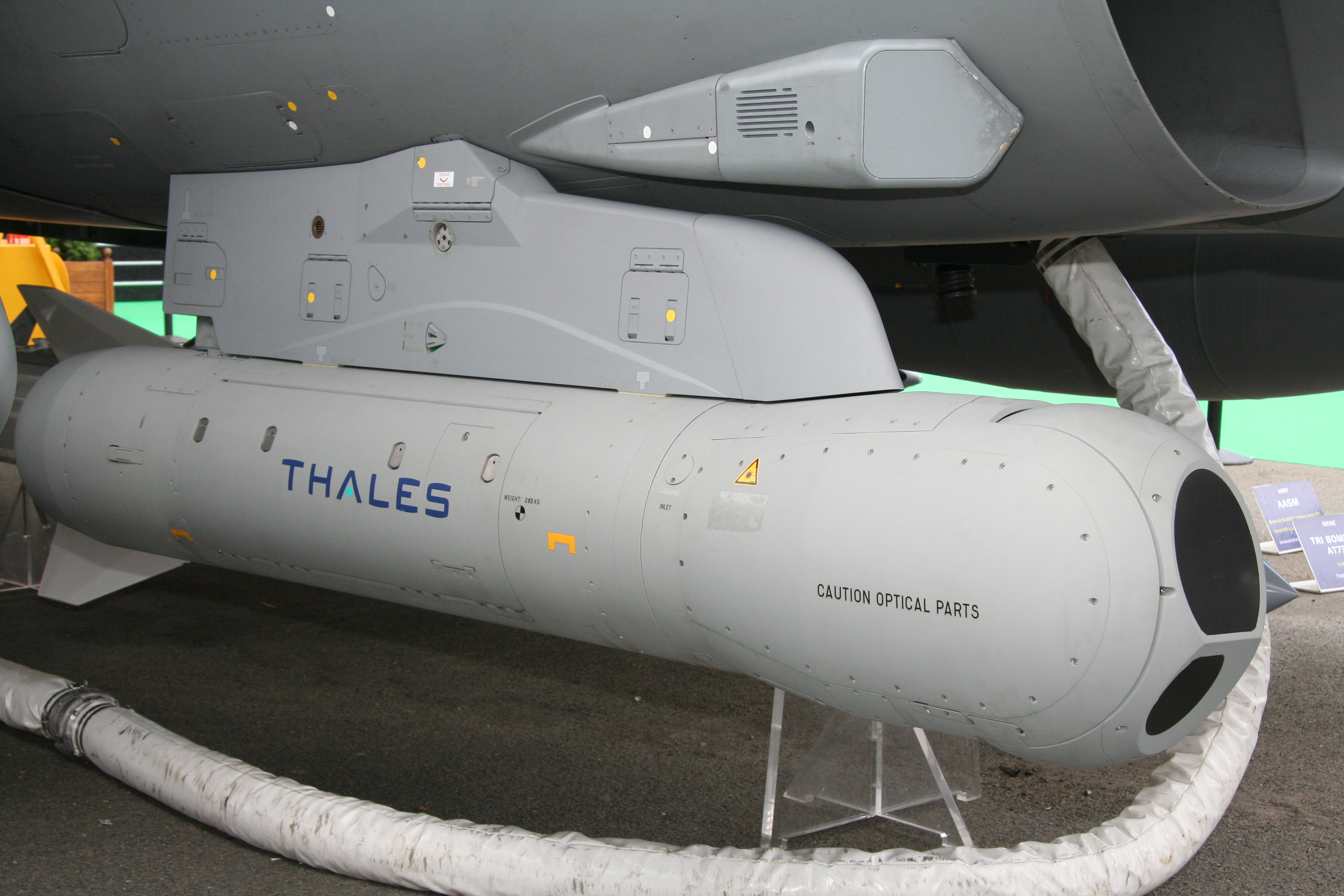
Damocles

Missile	Origin	Type	Versions	Notes
Air-to-air missiles
Meteor	France	Beyond-visual-range air-to-air missile (BVRAAM)		Acquired in 2025
AIM-120 AMRAAM	USA	Beyond-visual-range air-to-air missile (BVRAAM)	AIM-120C-8	100 missiles
MICA	France	Short/medium range air-to-air and surface-to-air missile	MICA IR MICA EM	
R-77	Russia	Beyond visual range, active radar homing air-to-air missile		
AIM-7 Sparrow	United States	Medium-range, semi-active radar homing air-to-air missile	F/P/M	
AIM-9 Sidewinder	United States	Short-range air-to-air missile	M/L/P	
R.550 Magic	France	Short-range air-to-air missile		
R.530	France	short-range air-to-air missile		No longer in service
Super 530	France	short to medium-range air-to-air missile		
Igla-V	Soviet Union	short-range air-to-air missile		
R-73	Soviet Union	short-range air-to-air missile		
R-27	Russia	Medium-range, air-to-air tactical missile, anti-radiation missile		
Air to ground/surface missiles
AASM	France	air-to-surface missile		
AS-30L	France	MCLOS with radio command link /laser guided short-to-medium rangeair-to-ground missile		
Advanced Precision Kill Weapon System	United States	guided rockets a design conversion of Hydra 70		
Storm Shadow	France	Air-Launched Cruise Missile	Talious	First foreign user of Talious version
AKD-10	China	air-to-surface missile		
Martel (AS 37)	UK/France	standoff anti-radar missile (AS 37) / air-to-surface (AJ.168)		
ARMAT	France	anti-radar missile		
Kh-35	Russia	anti-ship missile		
Kh-38	Russia	Tactical air-to-surface missile		
HOT	France	Anti-tank missile		
Kh-31	Soviet Union	Medium-range air-to-surface missile		
AGM-84 Harpoon	United States	Anti-ship missile	A	
Exocet	France	Anti-ship missile		
AGM-88 HARM	United States	Air-to-surface anti-radiation missile	B	
AGM-65 Maverick	United States	Air-to-surface missile	A/B/D/E/G	
AGM-114 Hellfire	United States	Air-to-surface and surface-to-surface		
9K121 Vikhr	Russia	air-launched anti-tank missile		
9M120 Ataka	Soviet Union	Anti-tank guided missile		
MBDA Apache	France	Anti-runway cruise missile		
BGM-71 TOW	United States	Anti-tank missile		
HJ-8	China	Anti-tank missile		
155 LR GPK	Egypt	Air-to-surface missile		A guided air-to-surface missile carrying a 155mm warhead, featuring aerodynamic control systems, GPS, INS, and electro-optical guidance. It is integrated with a long-range smart munition guidance kit, enabling a strike range of up to 80 km
122 GPK	Egypt	Air-to-surface missile		A guided air-to-surface missile carrying a 122mm warhead, featuring aerodynamic control surfaces, GPS, INS, and electro-optical guidance. It is integrated with a long-range smart munition guidance kit, enabling a strike range of up to 80 km
Air-to-ground bombs
Mk82	United States	Low-drag general-purpose bomb		
Mk83	United States	Low-Drag General Purpose (LDGP) bomb		
Mk84	United States	Low-drag general-purpose bomb		
KAB-500S-E	Soviet Union	satellite-guided bomb		
KAB-500Kr	Soviet Union	electro-optical TV-guided fire and forget bomb		
KAB-500L	Soviet Union	laser-guided bomb		
KAB-1500L	Soviet Union	laser-guided bomb		
KAB-1500S-E	Soviet Union	satellite-guided bomb		
LS PGB	China	Precision-guided munition, glide bomb		
Joint Direct Attack Munition	United States	Bomb guidance kit		
GWD-6	Egypt	guidance kit		A glide bomb capable of carrying a 1,000 kg warhead, guided by GPS, inertial navigation system, and electro-optical sensors, with a 50 km operational range
GBU-10	United States	Paveway-series laser-guided bomb		
GBU-12	United States	Laser guided bomb		
GBU-15	United States	Precision guided munition		
GBU-16	United States	Paveway-series laser-guided bomb		
GBU-24	United States	laser-guided bomb		
GBU-27	United States	laser-guided bomb		
GBU-31	United States	Fixed target, precision strike, moving vehicle		
GBU-32	United States	Fixed target, precision strike, moving vehicle		
GBU-89 Gator	United States	air-dropped anti-tank and anti-personnel mines		
CBU-87	United States	cluster bomb		
CBU-100	United States	cluster bomb		
BLU-109	United States	Free-fall penetration bomb		
Al-Tariq	UAE / South Africa	Precision-Guided Munition		
Matra Durandal	France	Anti-runway bomb		
Mark 46 torpedo	United States	Lightweight antisubmarine torpedo		
Mark 50 torpedo	United States	Torpedo		
NASR 9000 bomb	Egypt	fuel air bomb		
NASR 1000 bomb	Egypt	general-purpose bomb		
NASR 400 bomb	Egypt	general-purpose bomb		
NASR 250 bomb	Egypt	general-purpose bomb		
EGB-2	Egypt	laser-guided general-purpose bomb		
KAAKAA-500	Egypt	general-purpose bomb/anti-personnel bomb		
KAAKAA-250	Egypt	HE/incendiary bomb		
KAAKAA-100-105	Egypt	incendiary Thermite bomb		
KAAKAA-120	Egypt	anti-personnel bomb		
Hafez	Egypt	general purpose / bunker penetrator bomb		
Unguided-rockets
Hydra 70	United States	Rocket		
SNEB	French	unguided air-to-ground		
S-5 rocket	Soviet Union	Rocket		
S-8 rocket	Soviet Union	Rocket		
S-25 rocket	Soviet Union	Rocket		
