= Kaab (disambiguation) =

The Kaab or Kaaba (Arabic: ٱلْكَعْبَة, romanized: al-Kaʿbah, lit. 'The Cube') is a stone building at the center of Islam's most important mosque in Mecca, Saudi Arabia.

Kaab or variant, may also refer to:

== People ==
- Ka'b (name) also spelled "Kaab"; Arabic and Muslim male given name, surname, and patronymic
- Kaab, an Arabic tribe in Jazira Region, Syria

== Places ==
- King Abdulaziz Air Base (KAAB), Dhahran, Eastern, Saudi Arabia
- King Abdullah I Air Base (KAAB), a Royal Jordanian Air Force air base in Amman, Jordan
- King Abdullah II Air Base (KAAB), a Royal Jordanian Air Force air base in Al Ghabawi, Jordan

== Groups, organizations, companies ==
- KAAB (Hot Springs, Arkansas), a defunct radio station in Hot Springs, Arkansas, United States
- KAAB (Batesville, Arkansas) AM 1130 kHz (radio station), Batesville, Arkansas, USA
- Studio Kaab (Korean: 스튜디오 카브), Gangnam, Seoul, South Korea, Korean Peninsula; Korean entertainment company
- Nasiba Bint Kaab Primary Girls (Kaab School), Bahrain; see Lists of girls' schools

== Other uses ==
- Kaab (month) (Pashto: كب), 12th and last month of the Afghan calendar; last month before the vernal equinox

== See also ==
- KAB (disambiguation)
- Ka2b, a variant of the Schleicher Ka 2 Rhönschwalbe
