= KAB-500 =

Family of Russian guided bombs

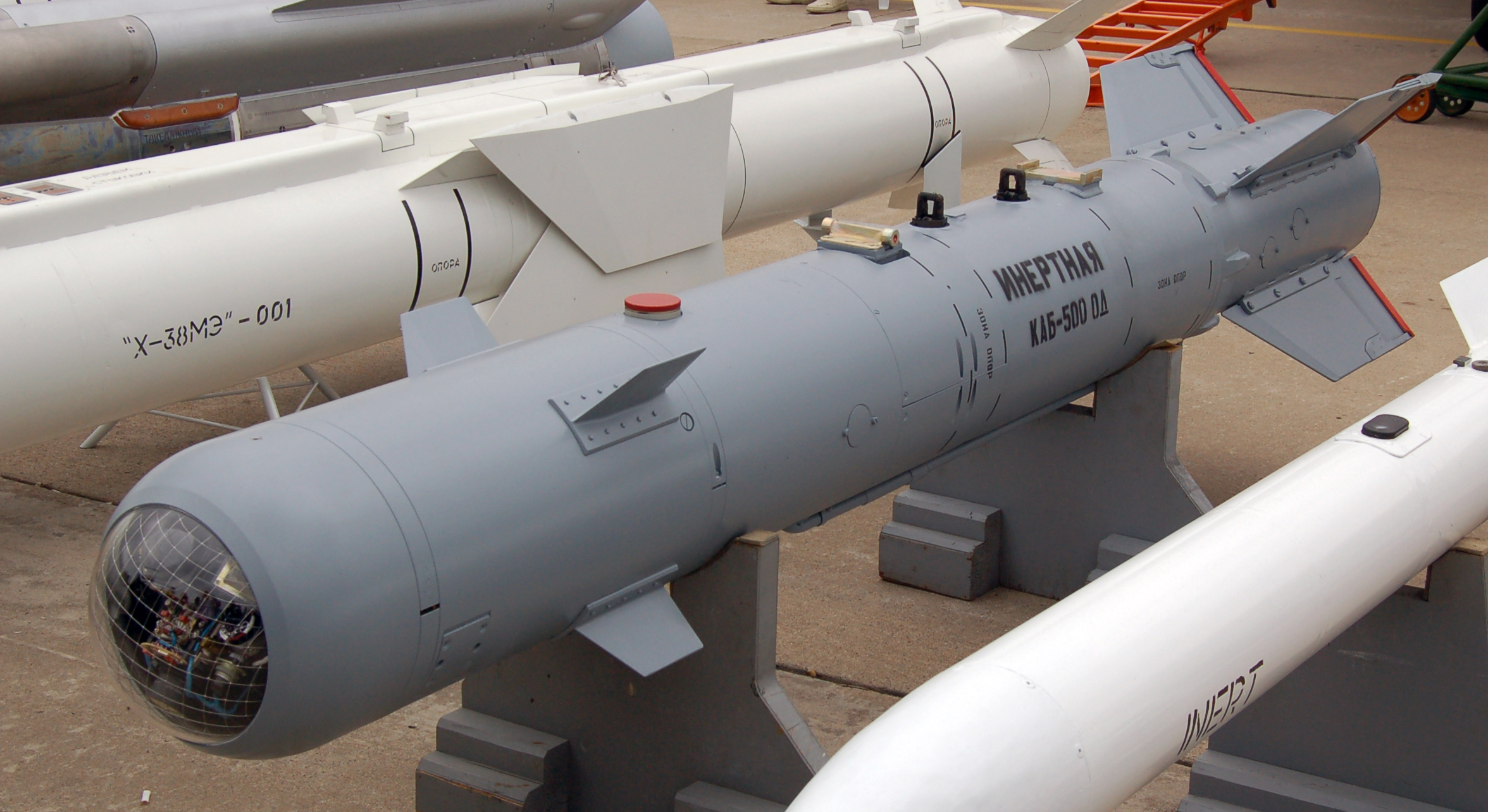

KAB-500 is a Russian precision guided weapon which comes in four versions:

- KAB-500KR TV-guided bomb
- KAB-500L laser-guided bomb
- KAB-500OD EO correlation TV seeker
- KAB-500S-E satellite-guided bomb

== See also ==
- KABs
