= Khab (disambiguation) =

Khab is a village in Himachal Pradesh, India

Khab or variant, may also refer to:

- Marion County – Rankin Fite Airport (ICAO airport code KHAB ), Marion County, Alabama, USA
- KhabAvia, a Russian airline based out of Khabarovsk
- Khab (康), a sub-clan of Miao; see Hmong customs and culture
- "KhAB-", Russian aerial bomb prefix
  - KhAB-250
  - KhAB-500

== See also ==
- KAB (disambiguation)
