= FAB-9000 =

Soviet/Russian demolition bomb

FAB-9000 ФАБ-9000
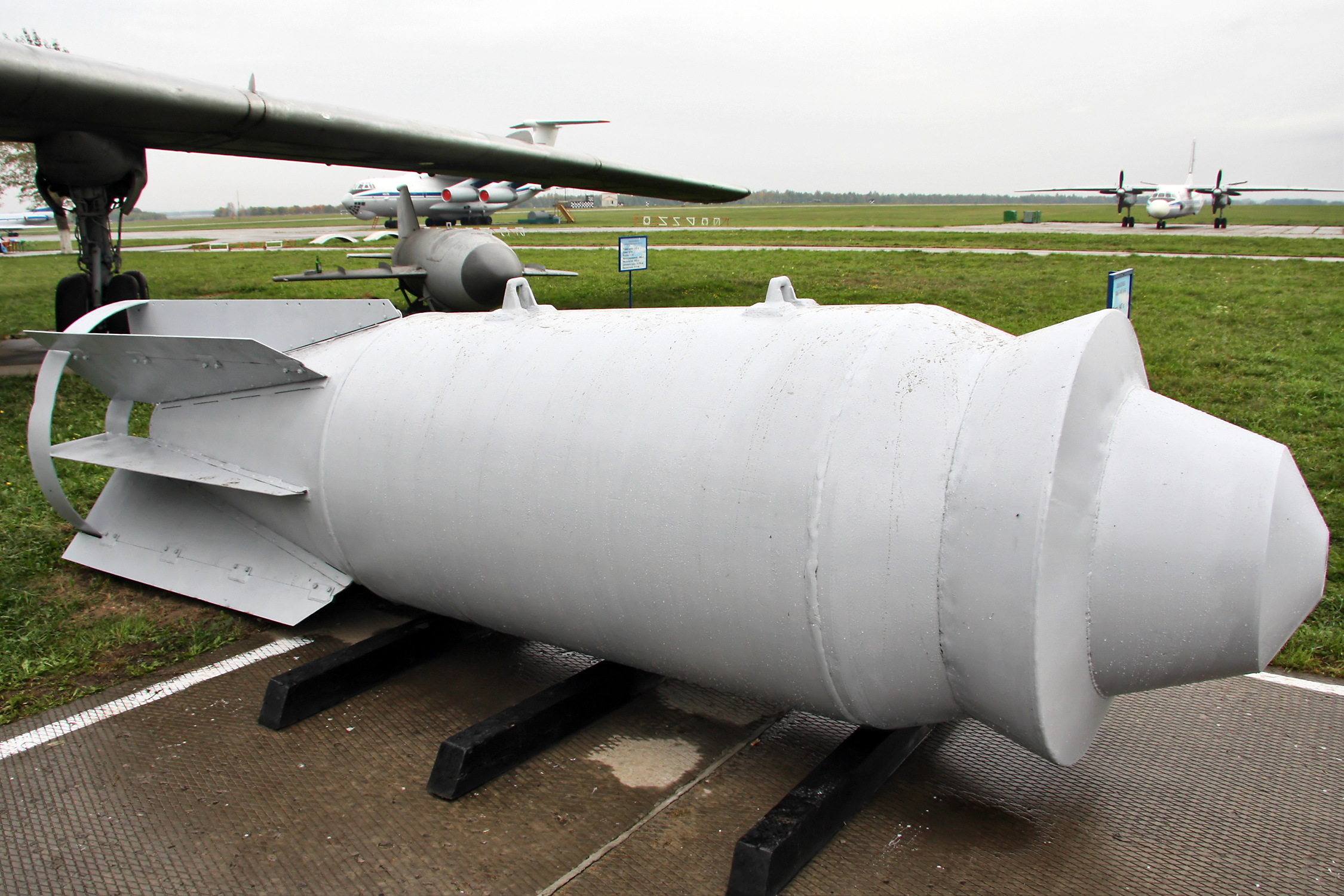
- FAB-9000 at Ryazan Museum of Long-Range Aviation
- Type: Aerial bomb
- Place of origin: Soviet Union

Specifications
- Mass: 9,407 kg (20,739 lb)
- Length: 5.05m
- Diameter: 1,200 mm (47 in)
- Filling: TNT
- Filling weight: 4,297 kg (9,473 lb)
- Detonation mechanism: Contact fuze, Delayed fuze

The FAB-9000 (Russian: ФАБ-9000) is a Soviet-made aerial bomb. FAB stands for Fugasnaya Aviatsionnaya Bomba ("high-explosive aerial bomb") and 9000 stands for the weight of the bomb in kilograms. It is one of the heaviest bombs of the Soviet Air Forces and the Russian Aerospace Forces.

It was developed in the early 1950s, and further modified later in the decade. It was produced by the Soviet Union and Iraq, where it is designated NASR 9000 bomb.

== See also ==
- FAB-5000
