= KAB-250 =

Russian guided bomb

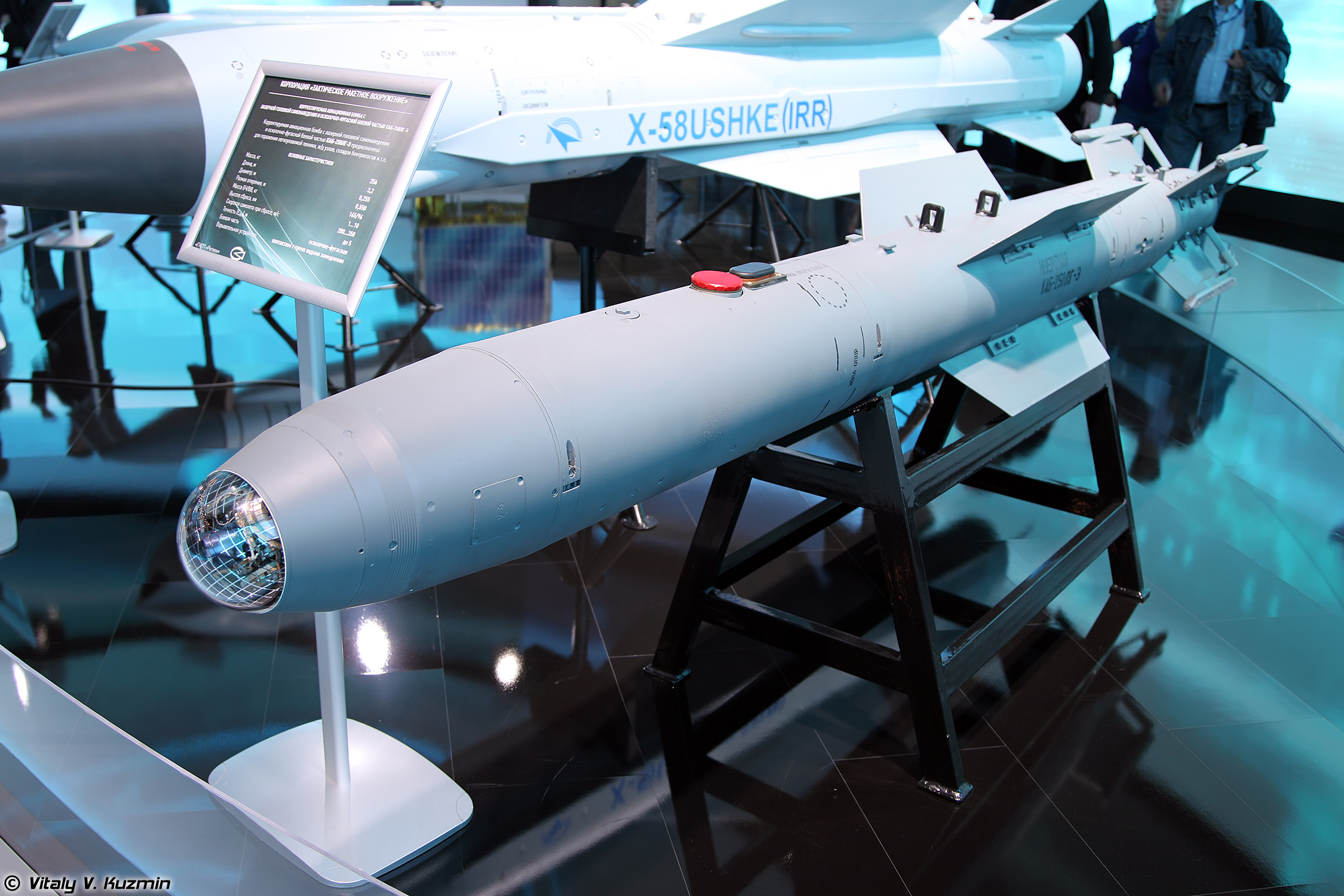
KAB-250LG-E guided bomb

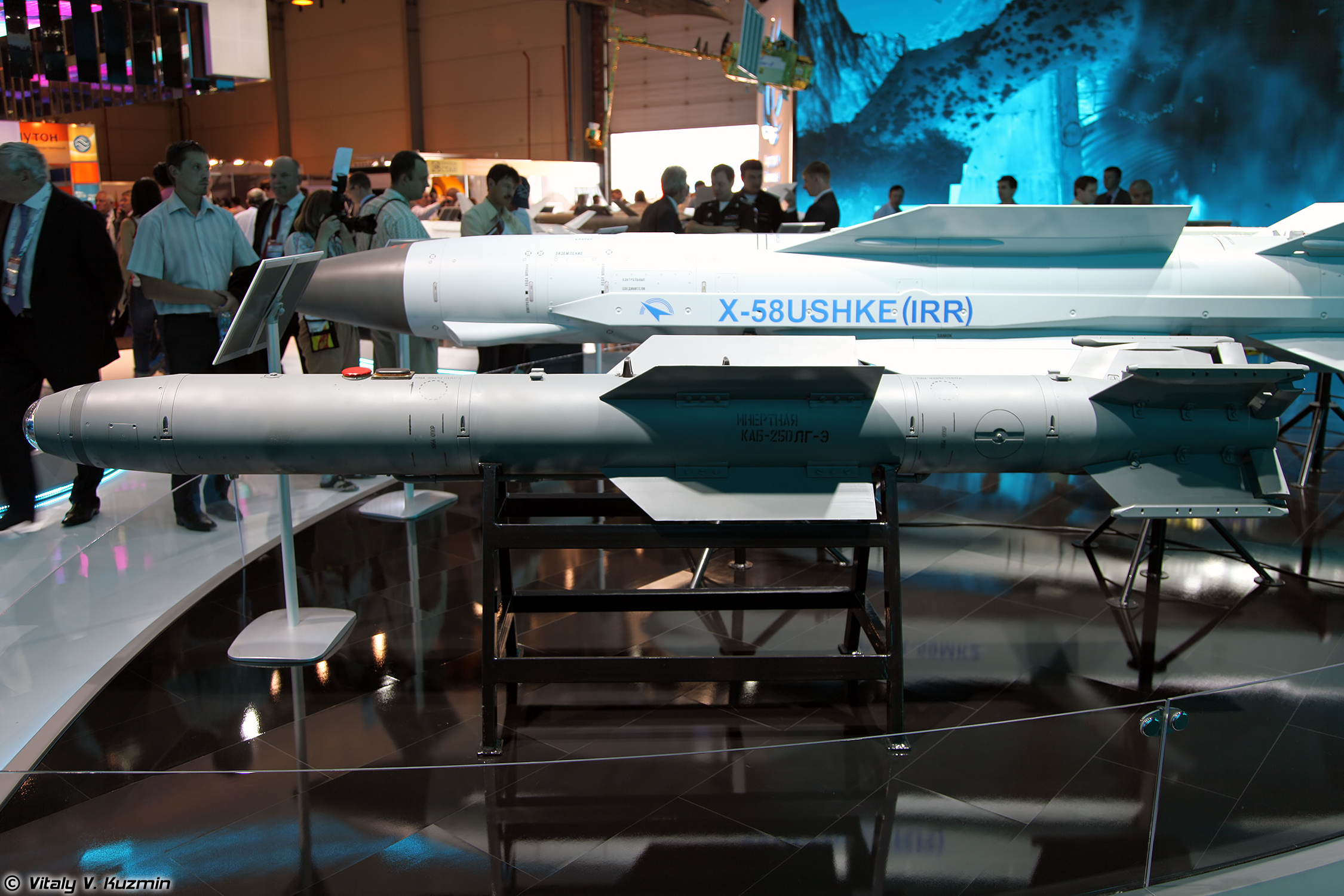
KAB-250LG-E guided bomb, side view

The KAB-250 is a family of aerial bombs developed in the 2000s. It comes in two forms, the KAB-250LG-E laser-guided bomb and KAB-250S-E satellite-guided bomb. It is being introduced into service with the Russian Air Force since 2020. KAB stands for "Корректируемая Авиационная Бомба" which means "Managed (corrected) aircraft bomb" and refers to high-precision weapons.

The KAB-250 is 10.5 ft (3.2 m) long and weighs 565 lb (256 kg). Its warhead makes up 365 lb (166 kg) of the total weight, of which 200 lb (91 kg) is blast-effect high explosive. Russian sources credit it with a CEP of 3 meters (9.8 feet) to 5 meters (16 feet). The technology of KAB-250 is also used for the larger KAB-500L.

It has a noticeable, egg-shaped form and has been integrated on and dropped by Sukhoi Su-34 on Islamic State of Iraq and the Levant targets from 5,000 metres (16,000 feet) altitudes.

== See also ==
- KhAB-250
