= KAB-1500 =

Russian precision guided weapon

KAB-1500 is a Russian precision guided weapon which comes in three versions: KAB-1500L, KAB-1500S-E and TV-guided KAB-1500KR.

The 1500 name indicates the weapon weight class - 1.500 kilograms (about 3.300 lbs).

== Variants ==
- KAB-1500LG-F-E Guided bomb with a laser gyro-stabilized seeker and a high-explosive warhead
- KAB-1500LG-Pr-E Guided bomb with a laser gyro-stabilized seeker and a penetrator warhead
- KAB-1500LG-OD-E Guided bomb with a laser gyro-stabilized seeker and a fuel-air-explosive warhead
- KAB-1500Kr-Pr Guided bomb with an electro-optical correlation seeker and a penetrator warhead
- KAB-1500Kr Guided bomb with an electro-optical correlation TV seeker and a HE warhead
- KAB-1500Kr-OD Guided bomb with an electro-optical correlation TV seeker and a FAE warhead

== See also ==
- KABs
