= KhAB-500 =

Soviet chemical bomb

The KhAB-500 is the provisional naming of a series of World War II-era aerial bombs developed by the Soviet Air Force to deliver chemical weapons.

== History and design ==
KhAB-500s were typically filled with yperite (R-5) or phosgene (R-10). It was 17.7 in (450 mm) in diameter and about 94 in (2,400 mm) long. Its loaded weight was about 650 lb (290 kg) including roughly 375 lb (170 kg) of chemical agent and a 2.5–3.6 lb (1.1–1.6 kg) impact-fused burst charge.

Upon detonation, the KhAB-500 R-10 would create a hemispherical cloud of gas with a radius of 20–25 m (66–82 ft). In ideal weather conditions, the phosgene cloud could produce serious medical effects up to 500 m (1,600 ft) downwind.

The KhAB-500 was carried by Soviet Union era aircraft.

The bomb was removed from service as a result of the Chemical Weapons Convention in the early 1990s.

== See also ==
- KhAB-250
- KAB-500L
