= KAAB (Hot Springs, Arkansas) =

Radio station in Arkansas (1940–1963)

- Hot Springs, Arkansas; United States
- Frequency: 1340 kHz

Ownership
- Owner: Phoenix Company, Inc.

History
- First air date: June 21, 1940
- Last air date: June 20, 1963
- Former call signs: KWFC (1940–1959)
- Former frequencies: 1310 kHz (1940–1941)

Technical information
- Power: 1,000 watts (day); 500 watts (night)

KAAB (1340 kHz) was a radio station in Hot Springs, Arkansas, United States. It began broadcasting as KWFC in 1940 and became KAAB in 1959 before closing in 1963. Throughout its operational history, the station suffered from financial difficulties, which ultimately led to its shuttering.

== History ==
KWFC began broadcasting on June 21, 1940. It originally aired on 1310 kHz and was owned by furniture dealer Clyde Wilson and Howard A. Shuman. Its studios were in the Malco theater on Central Avenue in Hot Springs. The station moved to 1340 kHz with NARBA on March 29, 1941. Shuman and Wilson later dissolved their partnership, with the assignment application noting Shuman's "complete lack of executive and managerial ability ... and his complete lack of finances", which caused him to "gain the ill will of the local advertisers".

In 1952, Camden Radio, Inc., acquired a majority stake in KWFC, with 25 percent being retained by Clyde Wilson. Camden Radio owned KAMD in Camden. Camden sold its share of the station to Wilson in 1957, only for Wilson to sell at a loss to the Phoenix Company, Inc., in 1958. Camden Radio was still owed money at the time and leased station assets to Phoenix for its operation, which used the KAAB call sign beginning in January 1959.

Operator Harmon Moseley, the station and its parent company owed the federal government $17,690.24 by 1963, while RCA held a lien in the amount of $4,900 and Garland County was owed back taxes. In March 1959, fire gutted the station, which was off the air until May. That July, a tower was damaged by an announcer driving a moving van, who clipped the guy wire holding up the center tower in the station's three-tower array. Camden did not restore the tower, leading to a poor signal, which Phoenix Company ascribed in KAAB's 1961 license renewal to "wholesale misrepresentations" made by Camden, which leased it "equipment so faulty as to cause frequent breakdowns and interruptions of service". The station was affiliated with ABC Radio at its end, having become an affiliate in 1953, and with CBS Radio between 1959 and 1962.

In November 1960, Camden Radio sued Wilson, Spa Broadcasting Company, and the Phoenix Company, alleging nonpayment. The lawsuit was continued several times until October 1962, and the next month Camden foreclosed on Phoenix Company. On June 6, 1963, assets of KAAB were sold to satisfy Camden Radio's judgment, with Camden Radio buying equipment used in operating the station as well as stock in Spa Broadcasting and the Phoenix Company. A previous sale attempt was mostly nullified due to irregularities, though Camden Radio was allowed to buy the tower site. The station ceased broadcasting on June 20, 1963. Spa Broadcasting Company and Phoenix Company intended to surrender the broadcast license, though Camden Radio obtained a court injunction preventing this from taking place. An application was then filed to transfer the license to Camden Radio. Two former employees filed lawsuits seeking to stop the transfer until they were paid back wages. Camden removed all equipment that had been used in the station's operation.

In April 1964, Broadcasters Inc., a company owned by two men involved in the operation of KBOA-AM-FM at Kennett, Missouri, applied to the FCC for a transfer of KAAB's license. KBHS contested the application, noting that all three stations in town had lost money and two (KAAB and KZNG) had been the subject of bankruptcy proceedings in recent years. KAAB was the lowest-powered of all the stations in the market. Two other stations, KZNG (then on 1470 kHz) and KCAT in Pine Bluff (then on 1530 kHz), filed applications seeking the use of the 1340 kHz frequency, which the FCC made mutually exclusive with the sale and renewal of KAAB in an order dated January 6, 1965. The FCC dismissed the sale and renewal applications in March 1966, giving Broadcasters Inc. a window to file a permit application to go into comparative hearing against KZNG and KCAT. The FCC granted KZNG's application to move to 1340 on May 8, 1967.
