= FAB-5000 =

WW2 Soviet large general-purpose bomb

FAB-5000NG
- Sketch of a FAB-5000NG
- Type: General-purpose bomb
- Place of origin: Soviet Union

Service history
- In service: 28 April 1943 - 9 May 1945
- Used by: Soviet Air Force
- Wars: World War II

Production history
- Designer: Nison Illich Gelperin

Specifications
- Mass: 5,400 kg (11,900 lb)
- Length: 5,200 mm (200 in)
- Diameter: 1,000 mm (39 in)
- Warhead: TNT, RDX and aluminium powder
- Warhead weight: 3,200 kg (7,100 lb)

The FAB-5000NG (Russian: ФАБ-5000НГ, where NG stands for its inventor, Nison Ilicz Gelperin) was a 5,000 kilogram (11,000 lb) large air-dropped, thin cased, high explosive demolition bomb used by the Soviet Air Forces during World War II. The device was the most powerful aerial bomb in the wartime Soviet inventory (until the FAB-9000 demolition bomb was developed during the Cold War as part of the M-46 series).

== Development ==
The bomb was designed by Soviet chemical engineer Nison Gelperin (1903-1989) in 1942. Gelperin planned and built bombs with thin metal casings, in order to reduce the use of cast iron and aluminium. In Gelperin's developments, the metal casings represented only 35 percent of the bomb's weight.

By 1942, the State Defense Committee of the Soviet Union perceived the need for weapons that could hit hard industrial and military facilities, marshaling yards and fortifications, without the usual scattering of medium-weight bombs. The first attempt came in the form of an explosive unmanned aircraft, a modified version of the TB-3, but the trials of this flying bomb were less than satisfactory.

The Directorate of Logistics of the Air Forces eventually requested to Gelperin the development of a five-ton bomb, capable of being dropped by the Pe-8, the heaviest Soviet bomber of the time. The definitive version of the FAB-5000 was fitted with six contact lateral fuses, and the warhead was filled with 3200 kg (7055 lb) of an explosive mixture of TNT, RDX, and aluminium powder. The number of fuses ensured that the force of the blast would disperse laterally, which increases the damage in areas such as industrial compounds and military facilities. In order to load the device, the bomber's bay doors had to remain half-open. The tests, however, were successful. Two bombs were dropped, one from an altitude of 4,000 m and the other from 3,300 m. The first bomb fell in open ground, leaving a crater 6 metres (20 ft) in diameter and 3 metres (9.8 ft) in depth. Grass in a radius of 150 m was charred. The second bomb landed in the woods, and left a crater of 8 metres (26 ft) in diameter and 3 metres (9.8 ft) in depth. Some 600 trees with a diameters ranging from 150mm to 500mm, thinner 150mm were not counted, were torn out within a 70 m radius, while 30 percent of the trees within 135 m radius also fell down. Later tests produced craters up to 20 metres (66 ft) in diameter and 9 metres (30 ft) in depth. The project was brought to the assembly line and the bomb was hastily put in service on 15 February 1943. By the end of the war, 98 FAB-5000s had been delivered to the Soviet Air Forces, all of them produced in 1943.

== Operational use ==
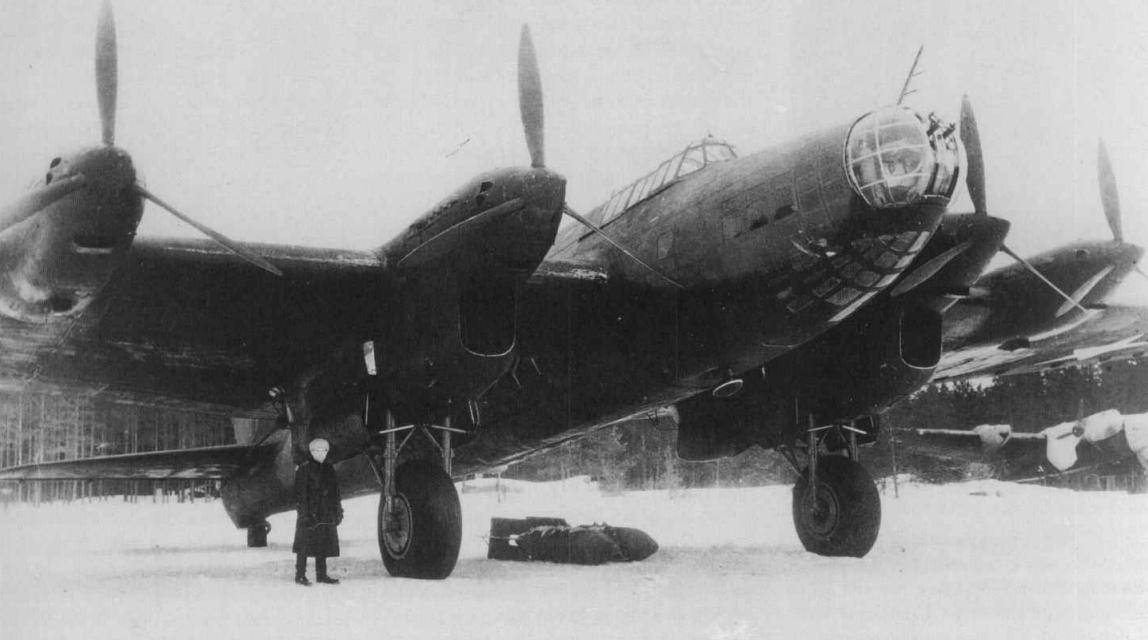
Pe-8 bomber

The first combat use of the FAB-5000 took place on the night of 28 April 1943, when coastal fortifications at Königsberg were hit. The Pe-8 bomber that dropped the bomb from an altitude of 5,800 m (19,000 ft) was shaken by the shockwave of the explosion. On 19 July 1943, during the battle of Kursk, two Pe-8 dropped two bombs on a railroad yard near Orel, ripping apart a 100 m section of the railway and obliterating dozens of railcars and German military vehicles. Railroads and fuel depots had already been hit around Orel with one bomb on 4 June and with two bombs on 3 July. Two attacks were carried out on advancing German troops on 12 July, but further tactical use was suspended to avoid the risk of friendly fire. Soviet sources also claim that two buildings occupied by the Gestapo and the collaborationist Belarusian Auxiliary Police were demolished by two FAB-5000 bombs at the city of Mogilev, Belarus, apparently on 26 May 1943. On 7 February 1944, another two FAB-5000 bombs were dropped on Helsinki, in the course of the 1944 Great Raids. Soviet sources claim that railway workshops and a cable factory were destroyed. A couple of days later, two more bombs fell on Finland's capital. The last FAB-5000 was dropped on the railway station of Brailiv, Ukraine, on 9 March 1944, during the Soviet offensive on the Kamenets–Podolsky pocket, halting all railroad traffic for several days.

== See also ==
- Blockbuster bomb – (United Kingdom)
- FAB-9000 – (Soviet Union)
- GBU-43/B MOAB – (United States)
- Grand Slam – (United Kingdom)
- T-12 Cloudmaker – (United States)
- Tallboy – (United Kingdom)
