= KAB-1500S-E =

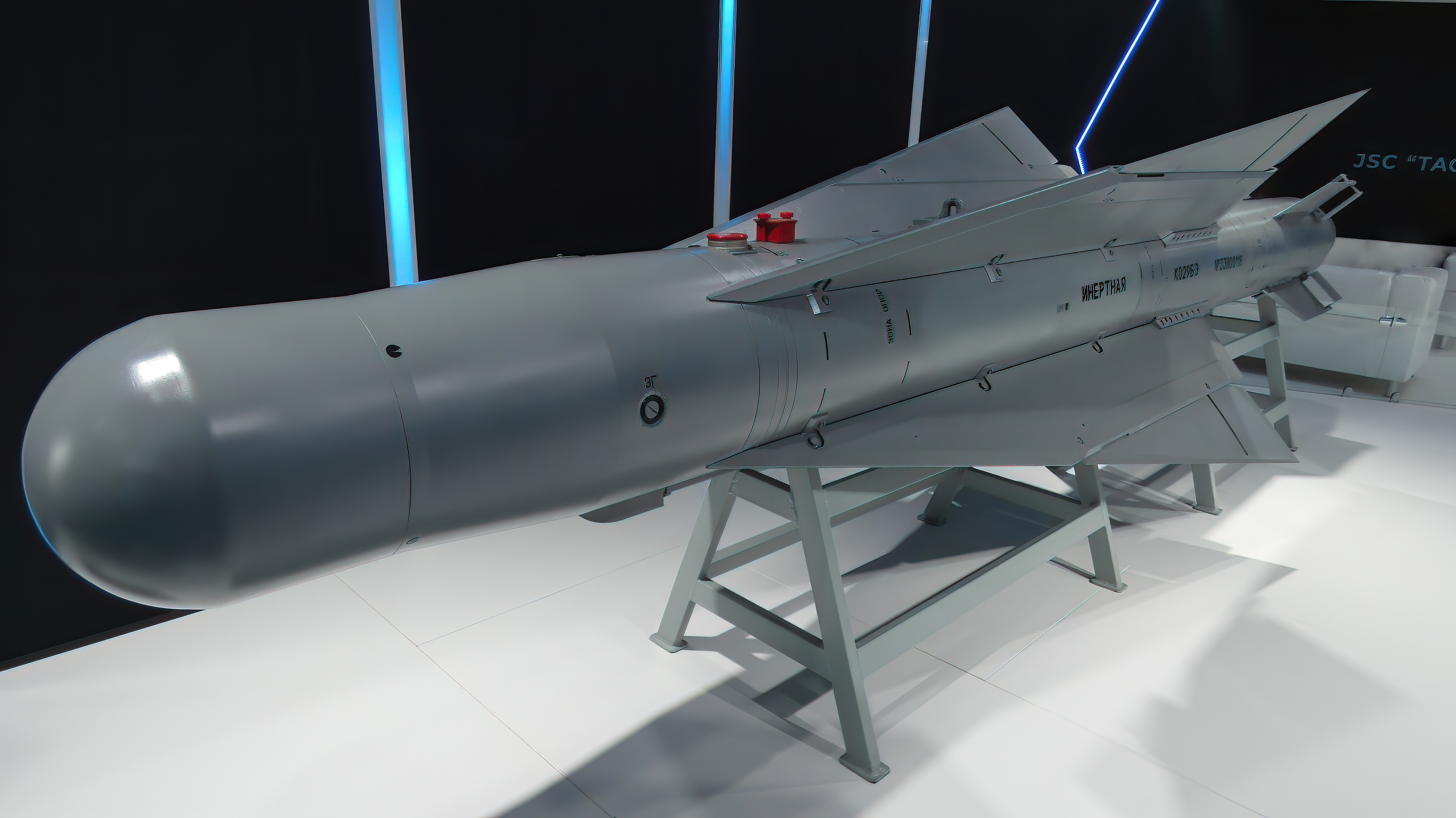
- Guided gliding bomb UPAB-1500B-E at MAKS-2021 airshow
- Type: GLONASS aided gliding guided bomb
- Place of origin: Russian Federation

Service history
- In service: 2019
- Used by: Russian Aerospace Forces
- Wars: Russian invasion of Ukraine

Production history
- Designed: 2000s
- Manufacturer: Tactical Missiles Corporation
- Produced: 2019

Specifications
- Mass: 1500kg
- Warhead weight: 1000kg
- Operational range: 50 km

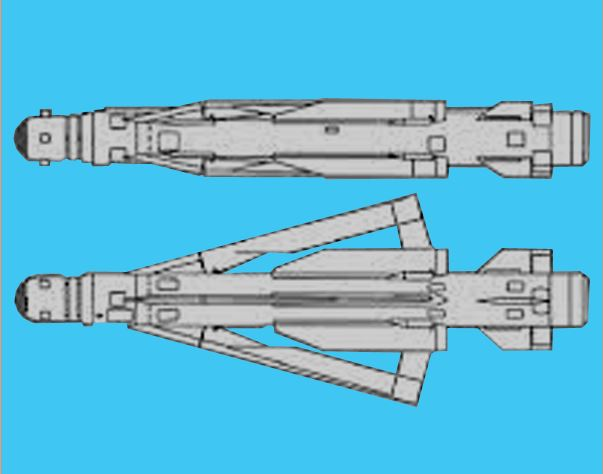
UPAB 1500 KR diagram

The KAB-1500S-E (Russian: КАБ-1500С-Э) is a precision guided bomb, part of KAB-1500 family, designed for the Russian Aerospace Forces to carry out precision attacks, using 24-channel GLONASS and is equivalent to the United States Air Force (USAF) Joint Direct Attack Munition (JDAM) family of Global Positioning System (GPS) guided weapons.

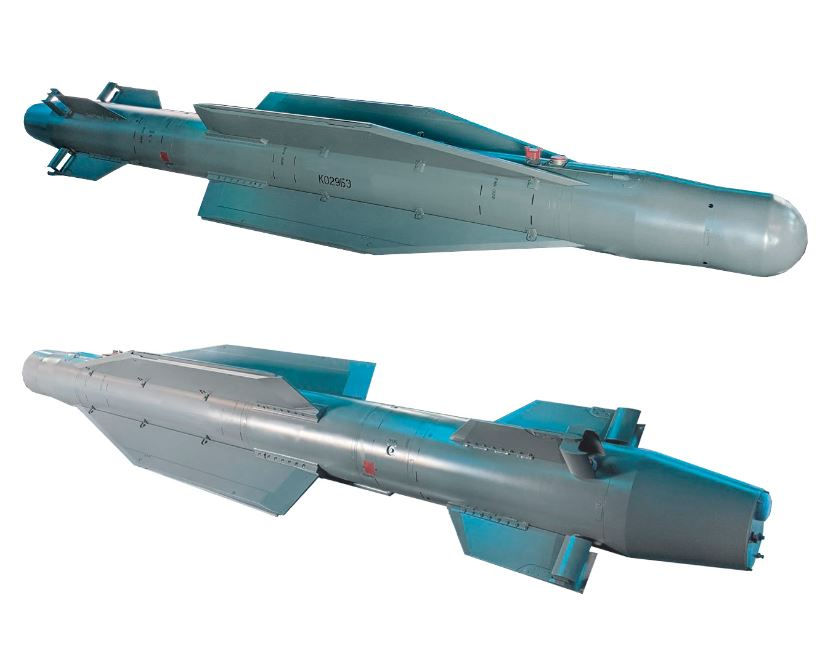
The UPAB1500B guided gliding bomb

It is believed to be similar to the KAB-500S-E, and to use the same Kompas PSN-2001 (Pribor Sputnikovoy Navigatsii) satellite receiver. The manufacturer, Tactical Missiles Corporation aka KTRV, has fully completed testing of products of the K08B and K029B (UPAB-1500B) types, both products are in serial production and are delivered to combat units.

Russia intends to fit it to the Su-24M, Su-34, Su-35 and MiG-35 aircraft. They hope to export to India and China.

== See also ==
- KAB-1500L
