= Ka'b =

Ka'b, Kaab or Kab (Arabic: كعب ka‘b) is an Arabic male given name. People named Ka'b include:

- Ka'ab al-Ahbar
- Ka'b ibn al-Ashraf
- Ka'b ibn Asad
- Ka'b ibn Lu'ayy
- Ka'b Ibn Mama
- Ka‘b bin Zaid bin An-Najjar
- Ka'b bin Zuhayr

People using it in their patronymic include:

- Murrah ibn Ka'b
- Musa ibn Ka'b al-Tamimi
- Nusaybah bint Ka'ab
- Rābi'a bint Ka'b al-Quzdārī
- Ubay ibn Ka'b
