= NASR 9000 bomb =

Egyptian Thermobaric Bomb, variant of Soviet FAB-9000

The NASR 9000 bomb is a secret Egyptian locally produced fuel-air bomb primarily used and manufactured by the Egyptian Air Force since the 1980s. There are different types of this bomb such as the NASR 250 bomb and NASR 1000. The number that the Egyptian Air force possess of this type is unknown and Egypt was not known to possess such type of bomb until it appeared in 2013 in an Egyptian Air force training. not much is known about how many bombs Egypt made or the bombs complete information.
