= Kab (month) =

Twelfth and last month of the Afghan calendar

Kab (Pashto: كب) is the name of the twelfth and last month of the Afghan calendar. It occurs in the late winter season (from February 19/20 to March 19/20). It has 29 days in usual years but 30 days in leap years.

Kab corresponds with the tropical Zodiac sign Pisces. Kab literally means "fish" in Pashto.

== Observances and holidays ==
- 27 Kab: St. Patrick's Day
- 29 Kab: Feast of St. Joseph
- Last Tuesday of Kab: Chaharshanbe Suri

=== Movable observance ===
- Lantern Festival: Held 15 days following the Chinese New Year, date falls on first or second week of this month
