= KhAB-250 =

Soviet chemical bomb

The KhAB-250 is the provisional name of an aerial bomb developed by the Soviet Air Force to deliver the chemical weapon sarin.

The KhAB-250 operational weight has been reported as 333 lb (151 kg) and 514 lb (233 kg). The Tupolev Tu-22 could carry 24.

The bomb uses a burst charge to detonate on impact with the ground. It contains a payload of 108 lb (49 kg) of sarin.

The KhAB-250 was displayed at the Shikani Test and Proving Grounds in 1986 as a component of the then-current Soviet chemical arsenal. Contemporary analysts noted that it appeared relatively unsophisticated compared to Soviet conventional munitions of the same time frame.

The bomb was removed from service as a result of the Chemical Weapons Convention in the early 1990s.

== See also ==
- KhAB-500
- KAB-250
