= KAB-500KR =

Aerial bomb

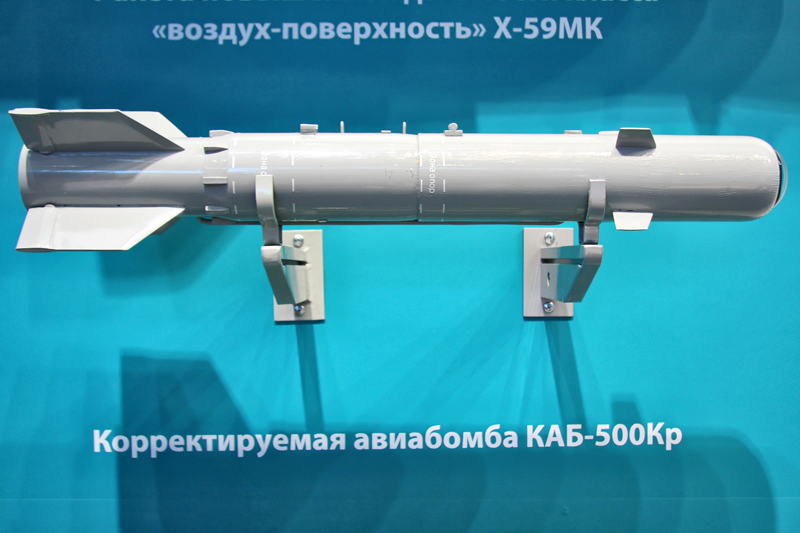
KAB-500Kr

The KAB-500Kr (Guided aerial bomb - 500 kg) is an electro-optical TV-guided fire and forget bomb developed by the Soviet Air Force in the 1980s. It remains in service with the CIS and various export customers.

The seeker employs a gimballed daylight television imaging sensor under a wide angle glass dome. Unlike the earlier US GBU-8 HOBOS and AGM-65 Maverick which employed contrast lock technology, the -Kr series guidance system employs Scene Matching Area Correlation technology more akin to the US Navy DAMASK seeker or Tomahawk DSMAC. This results in the ability to attack low contrast targets by exploiting the contrast of nearby terrain features or objects.

== Specifications ==
The bomb is 305 cm (10 ft) long and weighs 520 kg (1,150 lb), of which 380 kg (840 lb) is a hardened, armor-piercing warhead capable of penetrating up to 1.5 metres (5 ft) of reinforced concrete. The weapon's seeker can lock onto a target at ranges of up to 15 to 17 km (9.3 to 10.6 mi), depending on visibility. The KAB-500-OD variant is equipped with a fuel-air explosive warhead. The technology of KAB-500Kr is also used for larger bombs, such as KAB-1500Kr based on the 1500 kg class FAB-1500 iron bomb. There is also the training bomb KAB-500Kr-U.

The KAB-500S-E is a version with satellite guidance.
