= KAB-1500L =

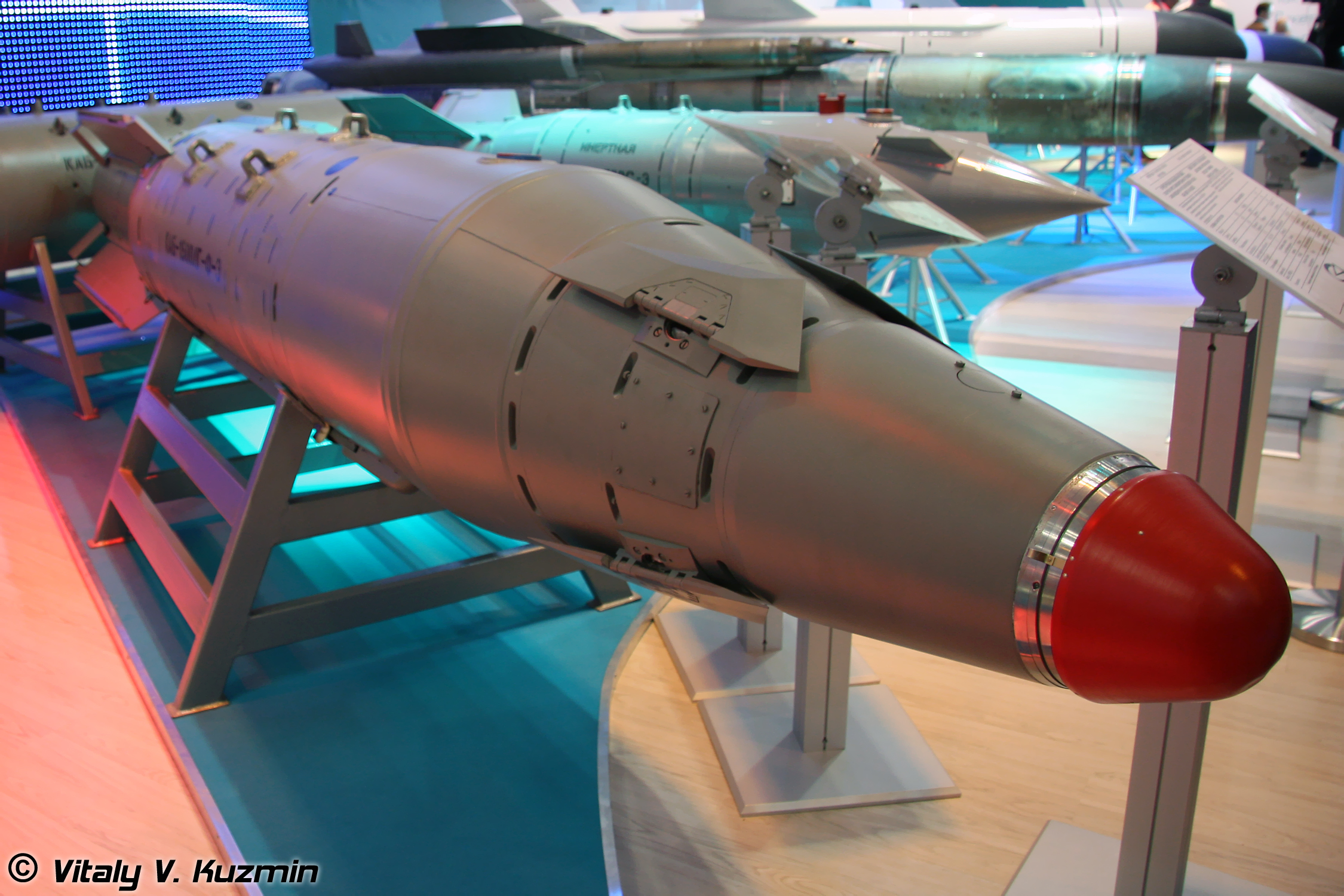
- KAB–1500LG-F-E guided bomb - MAKS-2009
- Type: Guided bomb
- Place of origin: Russia

Service history
- In service: Russian Aerospace Forces
- Used by: Russian Aerospace Forces
- Wars: Chechen wars Syrian Civil War; Russo-Ukrainian war

Production history
- Designer: GNPP Region
- Designed: 1980s
- Manufacturer: Tactical Missiles Corporation
- Produced: 1995
- Variants: KAB-1500LG-F-E, KAB-1500LG-Pr-E, KAB-1500-LG-OD-E

Specifications
- Mass: about 1500 kg
- Length: 4,280 mm (169 in)
- Diameter: 820 mm (32 in)
- Wingspan: 0.58 m (1 ft 11 in) retracted, 1.3 m (4 ft 3 in) extended
- Warhead: high explosive (LG-F-E), penetrating (LG-Pr-E), fuel-air (LG-OD-E)
- Flight ceiling: 8-10 km
- Guidance system: Laser-guided
- Accuracy: 4 to 7 m (13 to 23 ft)
- Launch platform: Sukhoi Su-24M, Sukhoi Su-30MKI/Sukhoi Su-30MKK, Sukhoi Su-34 and Sukhoi Su-35S

KAB-1500L is a Russian precision guided weapon, part of KAB-1500 family, a laser guided bomb and also the current production standard for use on 4+ and 4++ generation fighter jets, like the Sukhoi Su-30MKI/Sukhoi Su-30MKK, Sukhoi Su-34 and Sukhoi Su-35.

== History and development ==
It is claimed to be the Russian equivalent to the United States's Paveway II/Paveway III and is designed to hit railway, ammunition depots, railway terminals, highway bridges, military and industrial facilities, ships and transport vessels. The KAB-1500LG-F-E has an impact fuze which includes 3 different delay modes for target attack and it can also be mounted on older aircraft, like the Sukhoi Su-24 and the Mikoyan MiG-27.

The bomb has been used in the Russian military campaigns in Chechnya and Syria. The weapon has been reported as being used during the Russo-Ukrainian War. According to spokesperson for the Ukrainian Air Force, Yuriy Ignat, "Ukrainian forces cannot counter this weapon".

== See also ==
- KAB-1500S-E
