= KAB-500S-E =

Russian Federation guided bomb

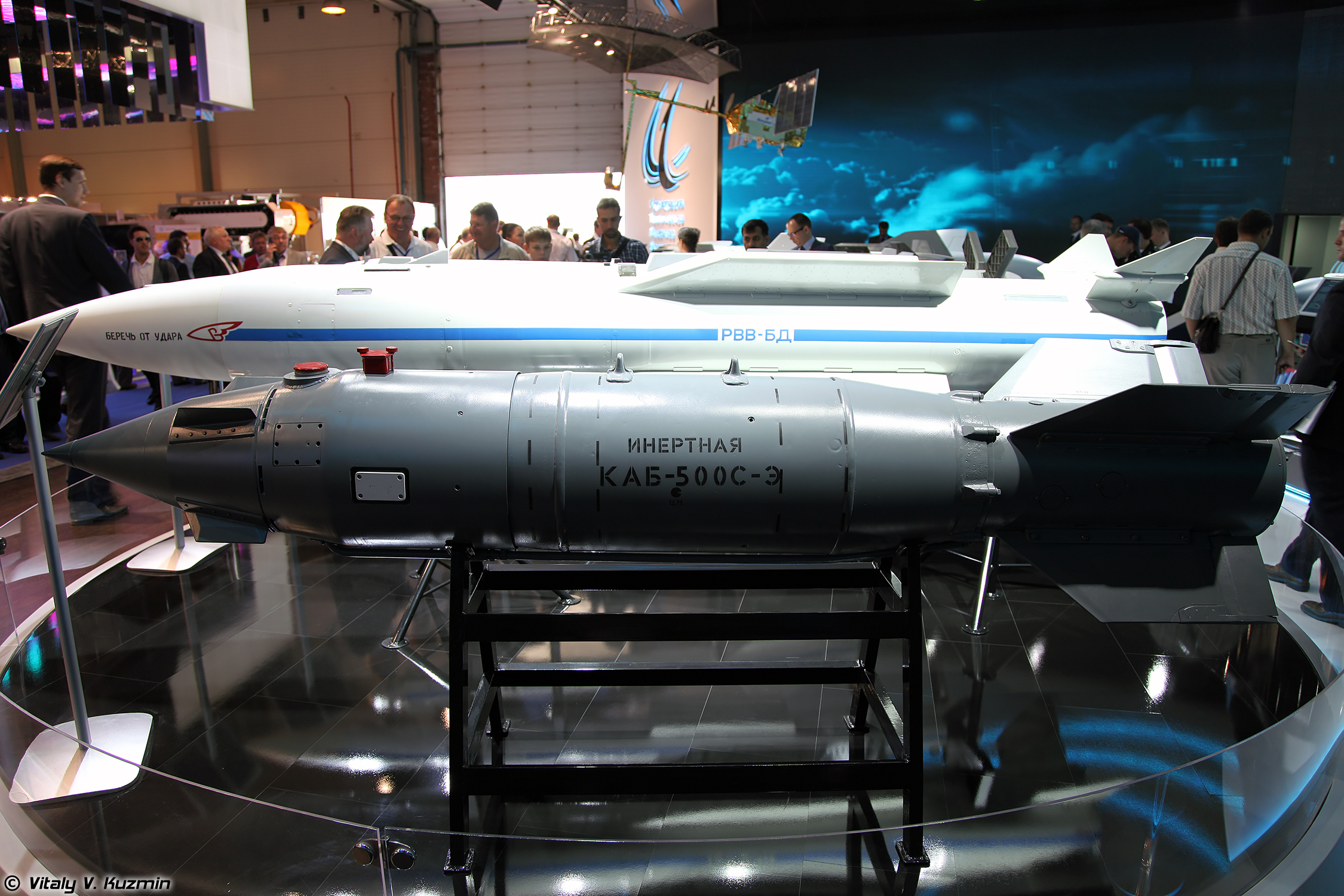
- A KAB-500S-E (grey) in front of an R-37 missile
- Type: GLONASS aided guided bomb
- Place of origin: Russian Federation

Service history
- In service: 2019-present
- Used by: Russian Aerospace Forces
- Wars: Syrian Civil War / ISIS

Production history
- Designed: 2000s
- Manufacturer: KTRV
- Produced: 2019-present

Specifications
- Mass: 560 kg (1,230 lb)
- Length: 3 m (120 in)
- Diameter: 0.4 m (16 in)
- Wingspan: 0.75 m (30 in)
- Warhead: 195 kg (430 lb)
- Operational range: 40 km
- Flight altitude: Maximum Launch Altitude: 5,000 m (16,000 ft); Minimum Launch Altitude: 500 m (1,600 ft)
- Maximum speed: Maximum Launch Airspeed: 1,100 km/h (680 mph; 590 kn); Minimum Launch Airspeed: 550 km/h (340 mph; 300 kn)
- Accuracy: 7 to 12 m (23 to 39 ft) CEP
- Launch platform: Sukhoi Su-24; Sukhoi Su-34; Sukhoi Su-35; Sukhoi Su-35S; Mikoyan MiG-35; Mikoyan MiG-35D

The KAB-500S-E (Russian: КАБ-500С-Э) is a guided bomb designed for the Russian Aerospace Forces and is also the first guided bomb of the Russian Federation. It uses the GLONASS satellite navigation system and is the Russian equivalent of the Joint Direct Attack Munition (JDAM) weapons family. It was first used during the Russian military intervention in the Syrian Civil War. The bomb's first trials were in 2000 and it was displayed at airshows in 2003.

It is designed to destroy targets in harbors, industrial facilities and depots and uses an impact fuse with three programmable modes. KTRV has fully completed testing of products of the K08B and K029B (UPAB-1500) types, both products are in serial production and are delivered to combat units.

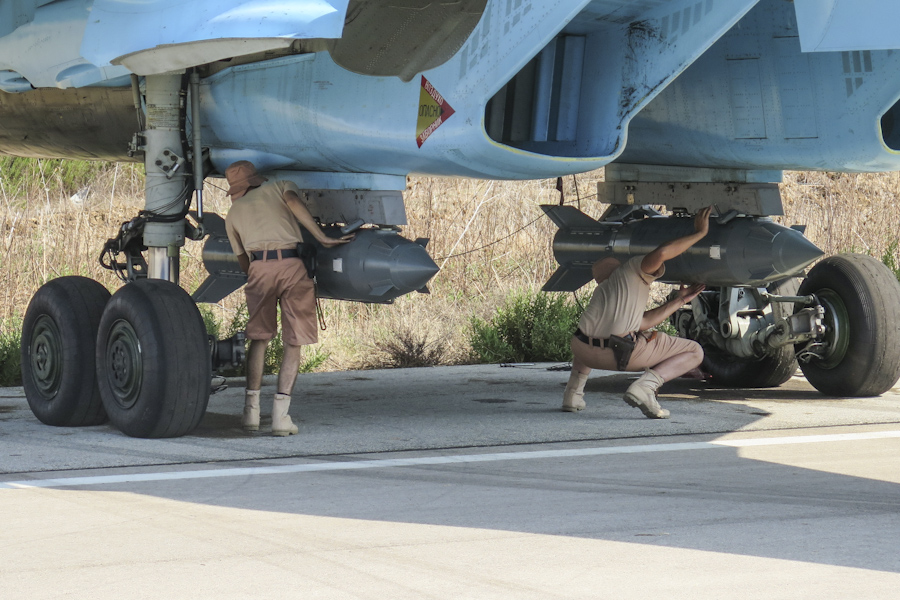
Russian personnel fitting KAB-500S-E bombs to an Su-34 aircraft in Khmeimim Air Base, Latakia.

== See also ==
- KAB-500KR
- KAB-1500S-E
