= KAB-500L =

Soviet/Russian laser-guided bomb

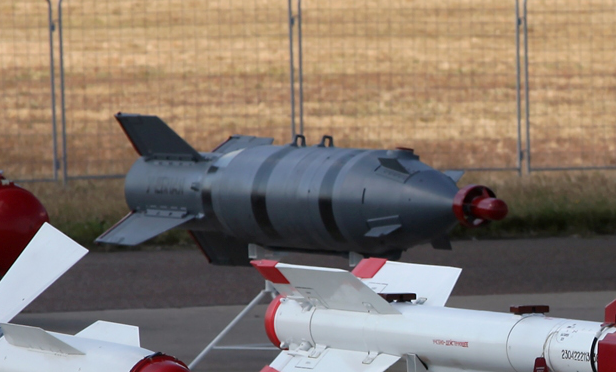
KAB-500L guided bomb

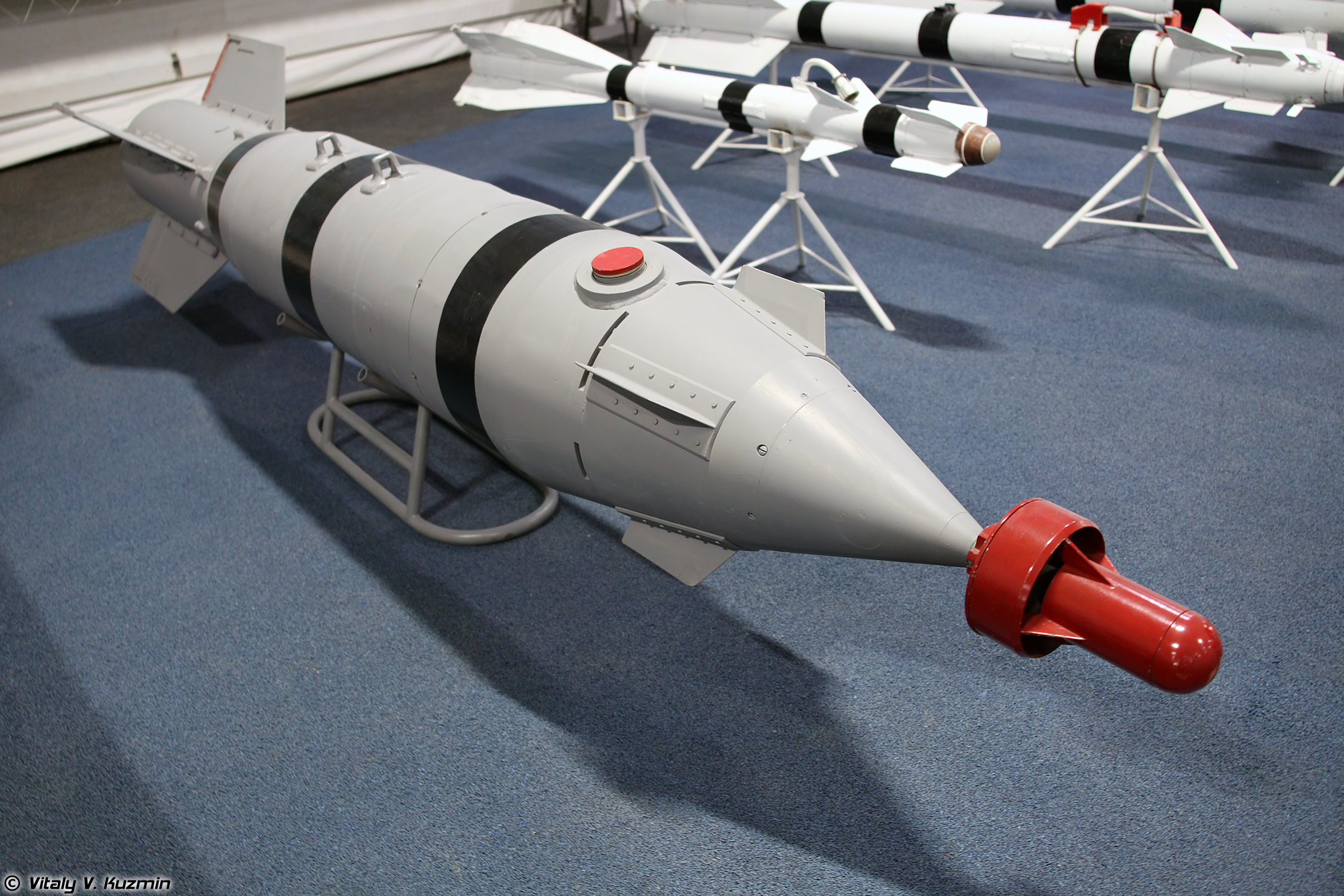
KAB-500L aerial bomb in Park Patriot

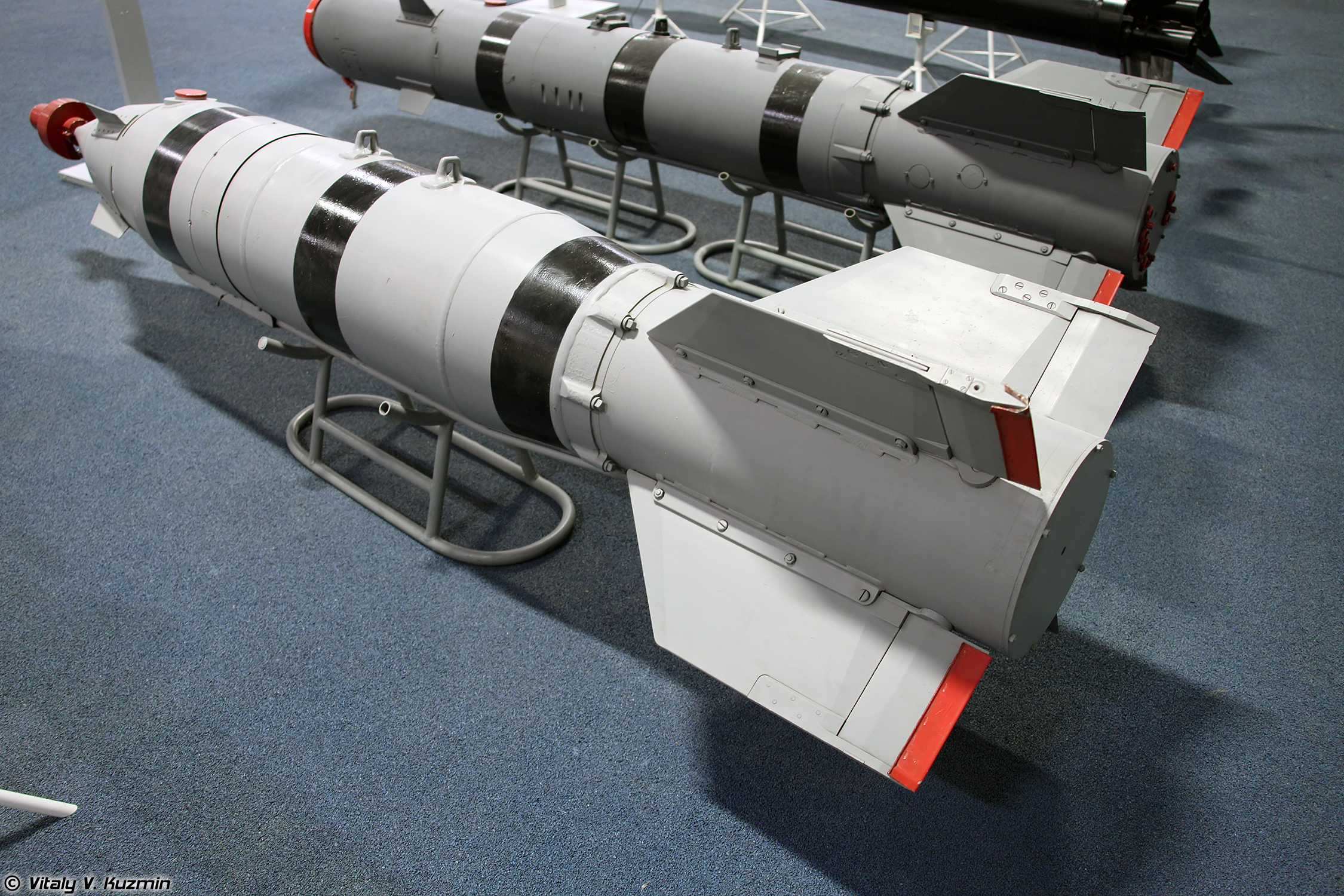
KAB-500L aerial bomb in Park Patriot, rear angle

The KAB-500L is a laser-guided bomb developed by the Soviet Air Force, entering service in 1975. It remains in service with the CIS and post-Soviet Russian Aerospace Forces.

The KAB-500L is 3.05 m (10.0 ft) long and weighs 525 kg (1,157 lb). Its warhead makes up 450 kg (990 lb) of the total weight, of which roughly 50% is blast-effect high explosive. Russian sources credit it with a CEP of 7 metres (23 feet). The technology of the KAB-500L is also used for larger bombs, such as the KAB-1500L family.

It is also deployed by the Indian Air Force. The primary launch platform is Su-30MKI. This bomb is also used by Royal Malaysian Air Force on its Sukhoi Su-30MKM.

== KAB-500S-E ==
KAB-500S-E is a Precision-Guided Munition (PGM) whose guidance system is based on GLONASS. The weapon can be dropped from aircraft flying at an altitude from 500 metres to 5000 metres and with an airspeed of 500–1150 km/h. The CEP is 7–12 metres. These bombs were used for the first time in the Russian military intervention in the Syrian Civil War in September 2015.
