= Mugh =

Mugh Муғ
- Location in Tajikistan
- Coordinates: 39°08′35″N 71°35′55″E
- Country: Tajikistan
- Region: Districts of Republican Subordination
- District: Lakhsh District

Mugh (formerly Muk; Tajik: Муғ) is a village in Tajikistan. It is part of the jamoat Lakhshi Bolo in Lakhsh District, one of the Districts of Republican Subordination.
