= 7th Tactical Aviation Brigade =

Military unit of the Ukrainian Air Force

- 7-ма бригада тактичної авіації
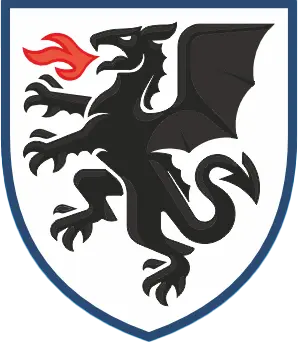
- Active: 1951 – present
- Country: Ukraine; Soviet Union (1951–1992)
- Allegiance: Armed Forces of Ukraine
- Branch: Ukrainian Air Force
- Type: Air Force Aviation
- Role: Bomber and reconnaissance
- Size: Brigade
- Part of: General Air Command
- Garrison/HQ: Starokostiantyniv, Khmelnytskyi Oblast
- Nickname: Petro Franko
- Patron: Petro Franko
- Engagements: Russo-Ukrainian War
- Decorations: For Courage and Bravery

Commanders
- Current commander: Colonel Yevhen Bulatsyk

Insignia
- Former Insignia

- Roundel

- Fin flash

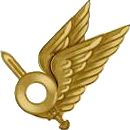
- Aviation branch insignia

Aircraft flown
- Bomber: Su-24M
- Reconnaissance: Su-24MR
- Trainer: L-39M1

The 7th Tactical Aviation Brigade named after Petro Franko is a formation of the Ukrainian Air Force.

== History ==
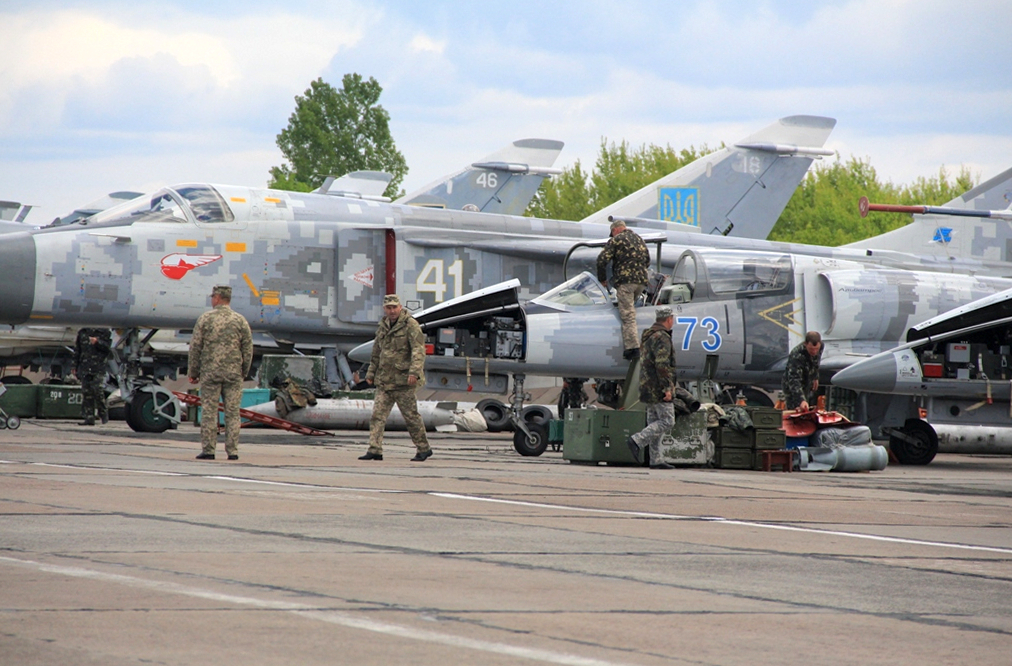
Su-24 and L-39M1 Brigade

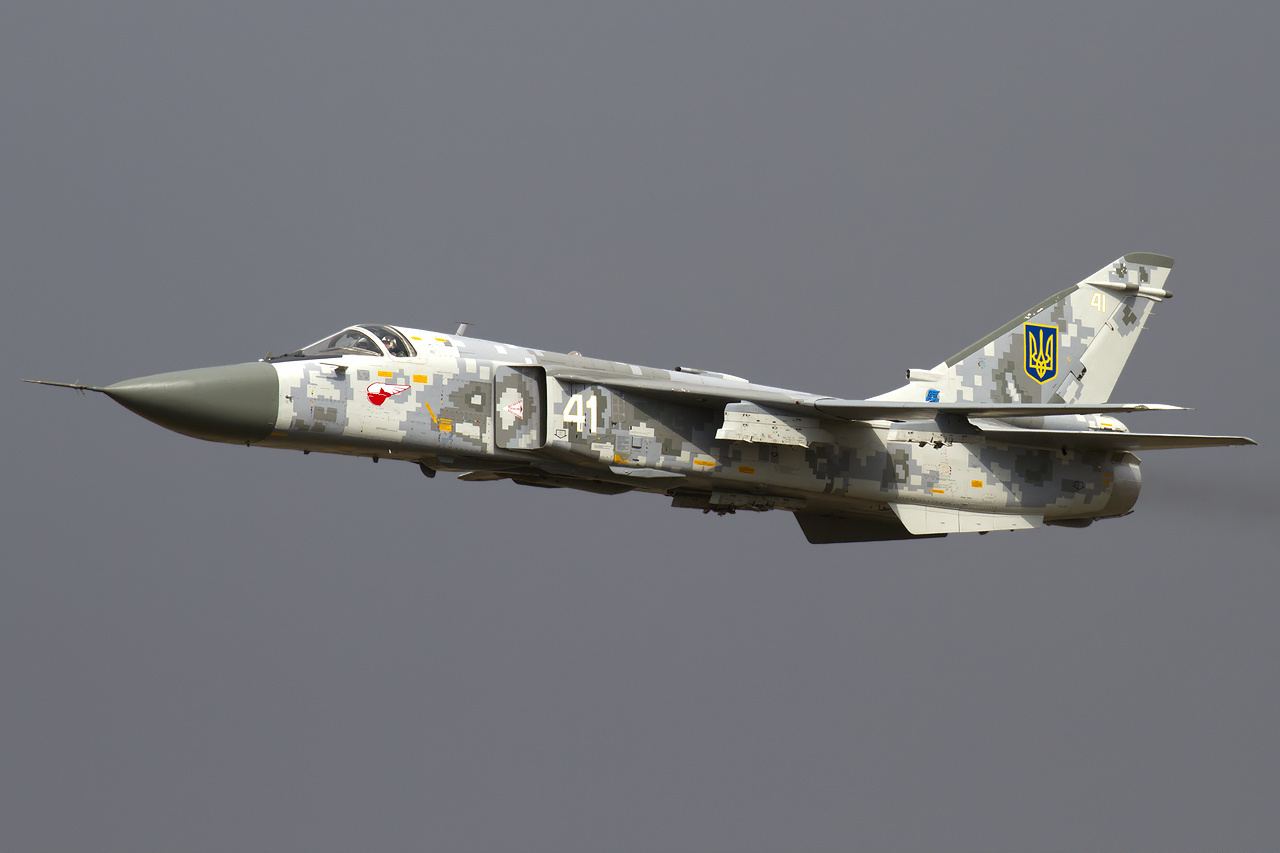
Su-24M above Starokostiantyniv

The 7th Bomber Aviation Regiment was formed in 1951. In January 1992 the regiment took the oath of loyalty to the Ukrainian people.

In October 2005 the former 32 Independent Reconnaissance Aviation Squadron from Kolomyia joined the brigade as its reconnaissance aviation squadron.

In 2005–2006 the Brigade became the first Air Force formation to be composed of professional soldiers and not conscripts.

On 20 August 2014, Su-24, bort number White 27 was shot down by a Pantsir-S1, the crew survived.

In August 2019 a Su-24M took part in the international air show “Gdynia Aerobaltik 2019” in Poland. This represented the first participation of a Ukrainian Su-24 to an international air show.

In December 2019 Su-24Ms from the 7th Tactical Aviation Brigade completed air-to-air refueling training for the first time in 20 years.

According to Forbes, 18 bombers were shot down by Russian Forces as of 22 February 2024, but despite being a priority target for the Russians, the 7th Brigade has managed to remain active by scattering its forces to neighbouring air bases (or even roads and highways) whenever missiles are detected by Ukrainian radars or NATO satellites, while the Storm Shadow/SCALP-EG cruise missiles allows their Su-24s to strike targets without entering Russian air defenses range. In February 2024, the Brigade commander Col. Yevhen Bulatsyk told the Voice of America that the brigade not only managed to make up for its losses of Su-24M/MR bombers, but expand its numbers by restoring as many grounded aircraft as possible.

On 16 June 2026, a Ukrainian Su-24 crashed in Khmelnytskyi Oblast, assigned to the 7th Tactical Aviation Brigade, while on a combat mission. The crash killed both the pilot and the navigator. The crew were identified as Major Bohdan Hryhorovych Zaharulko and Senior Lieutenant Bohdan Oleksandrovych Babenko.

== Components ==
- Two bomber squadrons
- One reconnaissance squadron

== Aircraft ==
In March 2019, the International Institute for Strategic Studies reported that Ukraine fielded 14 Su-24 attack aircraft and 9 Su-24MR reconnaissance aircraft on operational status.

Tail Number	Type	Status	Note
White 02	Su-24M	Operational	Repaired from 2014 damage.
White 03	Su-24M	Shot down - 1 March 2023 in Bakhmut.	Crewmembers, Lt Col Viktor Volynets and Sr. Lt Solomennikov killed.
White 06	Su-24M	Operational	
White 08	Su-24M	Shot down - 25 February 2022 in Voznesenske.	
White 12	Su-24M	Crashed - 6 May 2022 due a technical fault in a field roughly 20 km (12 mi) south of Martynivka Air Base	Crew ejected and survived
White 18	Su-24M	Operational	
White 20	Su-24M	Shot down - 24 March 2022 over Hostomel.	Crewmembers; Major Dmytro Kulykov and Major Mykola Savchuk killed.
White 21	Su-24M	Operational	
White 22	Su-24M	Operational	
White 24	Su-24M	Crashed - 16 June 2026 over Moskalivka, Shepetivka Raion, Khmelnytskyi Oblast.	Pilot Major Bohdan Zaharulko and Sr. Lt. Bohdan Babenko were killed.
White 26	Su-24M	Shot down - 9 March 2022 over Lebedyn, Sumy Oblast.	
White 28	Su-24M	Operational	
White 41	Su-24M	Shot down - 30 March 2022 in Kirovohrad, Kropyvnytskyi region.	Brigade Commander of the 7th Tactical Aviation Brigade Col. Maksim Sikalenko, and navigator Kostiantin Horodnychev, were reported dead.
White 44	Su-24M	Operational	
White 45	Su-24M	Operational	
White 46	Su-24M	Operational	
White 49	Su-24M	Shot down - 22 March 2022 lost near the village of Sulyhivka, near Izyum	Pilot, Mayor Oleksiy Kovalenko killed, navigator ejected and survived.
White 66	Su-24M	Shot down - 2 March 2022 near Novohrad-Volynskyi.	Pilot, Colonel Mykola Kovalenko and navigator Captain Yevhen Kazimirov, died.
White 69	Su-24M	Shot down - 19 May 2022 in the village of Krasnopolivka, near Bakhmut	Pilot Lt. Col. Ihor Khmara and navigator Maj. Illya Nehar killed in the crash
White 77	Su-24M	Shot down - 27 February 2022 in Bucha, Kyiv region.	Major Ruslan Bilous and Captain Roman Dovhalyuk killed.
White 84	Su-24MR	Shot down - 26 June 2022 by a Russian Pantsir-S1 system in the Black Sea	For destroying a Pantsir-S1 system on Snake Island, the pilot Col. Mykhailo Matiushenko and navigator Maj. Yuriy Krasylnikov were posthumously awarded the Hero of Ukraine title on August 6, 2023
White 87	Su-24M	Shot down - 30 April 2022 on Nova Praha, Kirovohrad Oblast	Crewmembers survived.
Yellow 11	Su-24MR	Operational	Damaged on 1 July 2014 by a MANPADS missile, but it managed to return to base and was subsequently repaired.
Yellow 16	Su-24MR	Operational	
Yellow 17	Su-24MR	Operational	
Yellow 35	Su-24MR	Operational	
Yellow 36	Su-24MR	Operational	
Yellow 54	Su-24MR	Operational	
Yellow 59	Su-24MR	Shot down - 12 October 2022, hit by a SAM. Crew tried to bring the stricken aircraft back to base, but it crashed near the village of Zhorzhivka, Poltava Oblast	Pilot Major Dmytro Bortnyk was killed, navigator ejected safely
Yellow 60	Su-24MR	Operational	
Yellow 93	Su-24MR	Operational	

Another seven unidentified Su-24M/MRs from the 7th Tactical Aviation Brigade were reported lost or damaged during the 2022 Russian invasion of Ukraine:

On 24 February 2022, a Su-24 was lost in Poltava. Both pilots survived.

On 1 March 2022, a Su-24M was shot down near the village of Krasenyvka, Zolotoni, Cherkasy Oblast. The pilots, were wounded but survived.

On 12 March 2022, a Su-24 was shot down by Russian forces near Bilyaivka village, Beryslav Raion, Kherson Oblast. The pilots, Valeriy Oshkalo and Roman Chekhun, died.

On 21 March 2022, a Su-24 piloted by Viacheslav Khodakivskyi was lost near Pokrovsky district, Zaporizhya, Ukraine. The pilot died.

On 30 March 2022, a Su-24 was recorded damaged with a trail of smoke in Rivne, western Ukraine on social media.

On May-June 2022, during the Ukrainian offensive and recapture of Snake Island, a Su-24MR was shot down by a Russian missile, the crew managed to eject and survived.

On 29 September 2022 a Su-24 was hit by Russian surface-to-air missile in Kherson Oblast. The aircraft was recorded on video with one of its engines on fire before it crashed. The pilots Lt. Col Yevgeny Solovyov and Captain Artem Hanko ejected.
