= Mehrobod, Lakhsh district =

Mehrobod Меҳробод
- Location in Tajikistan
- Coordinates: 39°21′N 71°34′E
- Country: Tajikistan
- Region: Districts of Republican Subordination
- District: Lakhsh District

Mehrobod (Tajik: Меҳробод) is a village in central Tajikistan. It is located in Lakhsh District, one of the Districts of Republican Subordination. It is the seat of the jamoat Sayliobod. It is on the river Kyzyl-Suu, a source river of the Vakhsh. The town is wedged between the river and the steep cliff sides of the river valley. It has a population of 4,000 people.
