= Domanakuh =

Domanakuh Доманакӯҳ
- Location in Tajikistan
- Coordinates: 39°24′06″N 71°41′33″E
- Country: Tajikistan
- Region: Districts of Republican Subordination
- District: Lakhsh District
- Official languages: Russian (Interethnic); Tajik (State) (Note: Constitution of Tajikistan)

Domanakuh (formerly Sarghoy; Tajik: Доманакӯҳ) is a village in central Tajikistan. It is part of the jamoat Sayliobod in Lakhsh District, one of the Districts of Republican Subordination. It lies near the river Kyzyl-Suu.
