= Chorsu, Lakhsh District =

Chorsu
- Location in Tajikistan
- Coordinates: 39°18′15″N 71°31′32″E
- Country: Tajikistan
- Region: Districts of Republican Subordination
- District: Lakhsh District

Chorsu (Tajik: Чорсу, formerly Jaylghan or Jayilgan) is a village in northern central Tajikistan. It is part of the jamoat Lakhsh in Lakhsh District, one of the Districts of Republican Subordination. It lies near the river Kyzyl-Suu, a source river of the Vakhsh.
