= Vladimir Ilyushin =

Soviet and Russian test pilot (1927–2010)

Vladimir Ilyushin Владимир Сергеевич Ильюшин
- Born: Vladimir Sergeyevich Ilyushin; 31 March 1927; Moscow, Russian SFSR, Soviet Union
- Died: 1 March 2010 (aged 82); Moscow, Russia
- Occupation: Soviet Union test pilot
- Awards: Hero of the Soviet Union
- Aviation career
- First flight: Su-11, Т-5, Su-15, Su-17, Su-24, Т-4, Su-25, Su-27
- Rank: Major general

Vladimir Sergeyevich Ilyushin (Russian: Владимир Серге́евич Ильюшин; 31 March 1927 – 1 March 2010) was a Russian military officer and a test pilot in the former Soviet space program. Ilyushin was a son of the famous aviation designer Sergey Ilyushin, and whose career was mostly as a test pilot for the Sukhoi OKB (a rival of Ilyushin OKB). After retiring from the space program, Ilyushin became a sports administrator and was inducted into the World Rugby Hall of Fame (then known as the IRB Hall of Fame) in 2013.

In 1961, Ilyushin was the subject of a conspiracy theory that he, rather than Yuri Gagarin, was the first cosmonaut in space. There is no evidence and no support for the theory.

== Career as test pilot ==
Ilyushin was a test pilot and lieutenant general in the Soviet Air Forces. He piloted the maiden flights of the Sukhoi's Su-11 (1958), Т-5 (1958), Su-15 (1962), Su-17 (1966), Su-24 (1967), Т-4 (1972), Su-25 (1975) and the Su-27 (1977). Ilyushin demonstrated his outstanding piloting skills as a test pilot of the Sukhoi Su-24. He flew a course so precisely that he caused a software crash in the aircraft instrumentation. That is, the software initially used in the nav/attack system of the Su-24 lacked a null function, and failed to proceed after it hit the so-called "machine zero", i.e. Ilyushin's actual geographical position became identical to the mission target input into the software. There had been no expectation that this objective would be achieved and there was no provision for it, in the software used during his test flight.

== Rugby union ==
Ilyushin was first exposed to rugby while studying at the Moscow Aviation Institute in the 1940s; according to World Rugby (formerly the International Rugby Board, or IRB), "His love of the sport was immediate and stayed with him for the rest of his life." He went on to a career as a rugby administrator that made him, according to then-IRB president Bernard Lapasset, "a true pioneer of Rugby in Russia". On 31 March 1967 (his 40th birthday), he founded the Soviet Rugby Federation, and was named its first president. By 1975, he had fully integrated the Soviet Union into the European international structure, and the following year played a significant role in the creation of a Soviet club championship. Ilyushin's career as an administrator continued into the post-communist era. He died two days after Russia secured its place in the 2011 Rugby World Cup, the country's first appearance ever in that competition. In February 2013, Ilyushin was inducted into the IRB Hall of Fame, now known as the World Rugby Hall of Fame, during the pool allocation draw for the 2013 Rugby World Cup Sevens in Moscow.

== Alleged first person in space ==
Two days before Gagarin's launch on 12 April 1961, Dennis Ogden wrote in the Western Communist newspaper the Daily Worker that the Soviet Union's announcement that Ilyushin had been involved in a serious car crash was really a cover story for a 7 April 1961 orbital spaceflight gone wrong. A similar story was told by French broadcaster Eduard Bobrovsky, but his version had the launch occurring in March, resulting in Ilyushin slipping into a coma. NORAD tracking stations, however, had no record of any such launch. Later that year, U.S. News & World Report transmitted the rumor by claiming that Gagarin had never flown, and was merely a stand-in for the sickened Ilyushin. The 1999 film The Cosmonaut Cover-Up takes the position that Ilyushin was the first man in space and discusses the alleged cover-up in detail. They claim, "According to recently declassified documents, Ilyushin was placed in a capsule named Rossiya, and the secret flight took place in the early hours of the morning, on Friday April 7th 1961". After a guidance malfunction, the cosmonaut is reported to have made an unguided crash landing in China, too critically injured to announce the mission a complete success. The 2009 film Fallen Idol: The Yuri Gagarin Conspiracy also takes the same position and further discusses US efforts to continue the allegation, even citing national security not to release information under the Freedom of Information Act. The data sought was from the CIA tracking station at Tern Island that supposedly covered and recorded Iluyshin's failed mission.

According to Mark Wade, editor of the space history web site Encyclopedia Astronautica, "The entire early history of the Soviet manned space program has been declassified and we have piles of memoirs of cosmonauts, engineers, etc., who participated. We know who was in the original cosmonaut team, who never flew, was dismissed, or was killed in ground tests. Ilyushin is not one of them."

== Honours and awards ==
- Hero of the Soviet Union (1960)
- Order "For Merit to the Fatherland", 3rd class (29 July 1999)
- Order of Lenin
- Order of the Red Banner
- Order of the Red Banner of Labour
- Order of the Red Star
- Order of the Badge of Honour
- Medal "For Battle Merit" (1955)
- Medal "For the Defence of Moscow" (1945)
- Medal of de Lavaux (FAI, 1963)
- Lenin Prize (1976)
- State Prize of the Russian Federation (1996)
- Honoured Test Pilot of the USSR (1966)
- Honored Master of Sports (1961)
- Medal "For Impeccable Service" 1st and 2nd class
- World Rugby Hall of Fame (2013)

== See also ==
- Flight altitude record
- Lost Cosmonauts
