= Starokostiantyniv Air Base =

Ukrainian Air Force base

Starokostiantyniv
- Starokostiantyniv, Khmelnytskyi Oblast in Ukraine
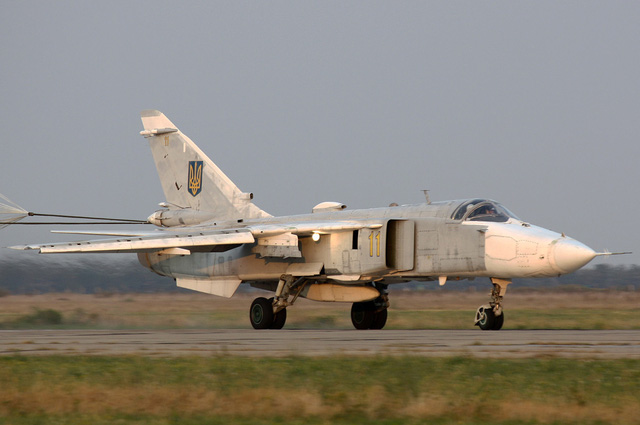

Site information
- Owner: Ministry of Defence
- Operator: Ukrainian Air Force
- Controlled by: Air Force Command

Location
- Shown within Khmelnytskyi Oblast Starokostiantyniv (Ukraine)
- Coordinates: 49°44′51″N 027°16′19″E

Site history
- In use: Unknown - present
- Battles/wars: 2022 Russian invasion of Ukraine

Airfield information
- Identifiers: ICAO: UKLS
- Elevation: 266 metres (873 ft) AMSL
Runways
Direction	Length and surface
11/29	2,475 metres (8,120 ft) Concrete

Starokostiantyniv (ICAO: UKLS) is an air base of the Ukrainian Air Force located near Starokostiantyniv, Khmelnytskyi Oblast, Ukraine.

The base is home to the 7th Tactical Aviation Brigade "Petro Franko" flying Sukhoi Su-24M, Sukhoi Su-24MR, and Aero L-39C Albatros aircraft.

== History ==
In the early 1990s the airbase became home to the 7th Bomber Aviation Regiment flying Sukhoi Su-24M aircraft. During the Cold War the 85th Fighter Aviation Regiment was also located at the base.

On February 13, 1992, shortly after the dissolution of the Soviet Union, pilots from this airbase took six Su-24 airplanes to Russia. To avoid detection by the air defense systems of Ukraine, they flew to Russia through Belarus.

After the Regiment became a Ukrainian formation it was subordinate to the 35th Aviation Group. Later, the Regiment was reorganized into a Bomber and Reconnaissance Brigade.

On 19 May 2004, 32 Orae was formed from the former 48 BrTA at Kolomyia. In October 2005 the former 32 Independent Reconnaissance Aviation Squadron at Kolminya joined the brigade as its reconnaissance aviation squadron.

In 2005-2006 the Brigade became the first Air Force formation to be composed of professional soldiers and not conscripts.

The sole McDonnell Douglas F-15D Eagle came from the 48th Fighter Wing, RAF Lakenheath, UK, giving the Californian contingent a two-seat Eagle to provide backseat rides to their hosts. The Ukraine Air Force's two-seat aircraft were often used for familiarization sorties and exchange backseat rides during exercise.

In the late afternoon of 16 October 2018, while carrying out one of these single-aircraft familiarization flights, a Sukhoi Su-27UB1M (‘70 Blue’) crashed resulting in the death of the two pilots, Colonel Ivan Nikolayevich Petrenko, deputy commander of Eastern Air Command/Ukrainian Air Force, and Lt. Colonel Seth ‘Jethro’ Nehring of the California ANG/144th Fighter Wing.

During the 2022 Russian invasion of Ukraine, on 6 March 2022, the base was targeted by Russian missile strike, damaging its infrastructure. During the night of 29 May 2023, five aircraft at the base were damaged in a Russian missile and UAV attack.

== Aircraft ==
The following aircraft are based at the air base:

- Sukhoi Su-24
- Mikoyan MiG-29
- L-39 Albatros
