= SVP-24 =

Bomb-targeting system

The SVP-24 is a navigation system that acts as a computerized bomb sight manufactured by Russian company Gefest & T, that is claimed to provide similar accuracy to guided munitions. It uses the Continually Computed Release Point (CCRP) technology. It proved to be highly effective in the Russian military intervention in the Syrian Civil War and is being rolled out to all bombers in service with the Russian Aerospace Forces and Russian Naval Aviation.

== Design ==
The SVP-24 consists of a GLONASS-supported nav/attack system, a new mission computer, liquid crystal displays, a flight recorder, and a keyboard. It reduces the time needed to program the aircraft's systems before a mission, and it improves the precision of unguided ordnance. It also allows the mission computer to be pre-programmed for automatic weapons release: forward air controllers are able to transmit standardised target coordinates to SVP-24-equipped aircraft. These are automatically fed into the aircraft's nav/attack system, which then generates flight direction commands for the crew to follow. Bombs are then released automatically, without the necessity of acquiring the target with the help of other on-board systems. This system's precision relies entirely on that of the GLONASS signal. As of 2015, the standard-precision GLONASS signal was insufficient for such purposes. Hence, in the first months of the Russian military intervention in the Syrian civil war, Russian aircraft equipped with the SVP-24 usually missed their targets by around 100 metres. Starting in mid-October 2015, differential correction stations were installed to improve the signal's precision. This improved the average precision of the air strikes to 30–40 metres.

== User aircraft ==
=== Sukhoi Su-24M ===
A modernization of the Su-24M was introduced in 2000 with the "Sukhoi" program and in 1999 with the "Gefest" program. It includes the SVP-24, a new HUD (ILS-31, like in Su-27SM or KAI-24) and expanded armament options (Kh-31, Kh-59MK, KAB-500S). The last batch of aircraft modernised in accordance to the Sukhoi program was delivered to the VVS in 2009. The modernization continues with the program "Gefest". All Su-24s in the Central Military District received the SVP-24 in 2013.

=== Sukhoi Su-25 ===
The Su-25SM3 received the SVP-24 as a result of experience in Syria.

=== Sukhoi Su-33 ===
In September 2016, it was announced the Su-33 would be outfitted with the SVP-24.

=== Tupolev Tu-22M3 ===
The Tu-22M3 is being upgraded with the SVP-24-22 system, and digital processing for the aircraft's radar. A SVP-24-22-equipped Tu-22M underwent trials in 2009, and the program has been ordered into production, with deliveries starting in 2012.

=== Tupolev Tu-95 ===
The Tu-95MS is to be upgraded with the SVP-24.

=== Tupolev Tu-142 ===
The Russian Navy plans to upgrade the Tu-142 anti-submarine aircraft with the installation of the SVP-24 bombing system.
