= Dumbrasozon =

Dumbrasozon Думбрасозон
- Location in Tajikistan
- Coordinates: 39°16′20″N 71°22′49″E
- Country: Tajikistan
- Region: Districts of Republican Subordination
- District: Lakhsh District

Dumbrasozon (formerly Dombrachi; Tajik: Думбрасозон) is a village in central Tajikistan. It is part of the jamoat Istiqlol in Lakhsh District, one of the Districts of Republican Subordination. It lies at the confluence of the rivers Kyzyl-Suu and Muksu, forming the Surkhob.
