= Vahdat, Lakhsh District =

Vahdat Ваҳдат
- Town and Jamoat
- Location within Tajikistan
- Coordinates: 39°13′N 71°11′E
- Country: Tajikistan
- Region: Districts of Republican Subordination
- District: Lakhsh District

Population (2020)
  - Total: 6,400
- Time zone: UTC+5 (TJT)
- Official languages: Russian (Interethnic); Tajik (State) (Note: Constitution of Tajikistan)

Vahdat (Tajik: Ваҳдат, Russian: Ҷиргатол, Kyrgyz: Jerge-Tal) is a town and jamoat in Tajikistan. It is the seat of Lakhsh District (formerly Jirgatol District), one of the Districts of Republican Subordination. The population of the town is 6,400 (January 2020 estimate).
