= Pildon =

- Village and Jamoat
- Location within Tajikistan
- Coordinates: 39°10′N 71°02′E
- Country: Tajikistan
- Region: Districts of Republican Subordination
- District: Lakhsh District

Population (2015)
  - Total: 7,790
- Time zone: UTC+5 (TJT)
- Official languages: Russian (Interethnic); Tajik (State) (Note: Constitution of Tajikistan)

Pildon (Russian and Tajik: Пилдон, Persian: پــِلدان) is a village and jamoat in Tajikistan. It is located in Lakhsh District, one of the Districts of Republican Subordination. The jamoat has a total population of 7,790 (2015).
