= Surkhob, Lakhsh District =

Surkhob
- Jamoat
- Location within Tajikistan
- Coordinates: 39°12′N 71°17′E
- Country: Tajikistan
- Region: Districts of Republican Subordination
- District: Lakhsh District

Population (2015)
  - Total: 2,987
- Time zone: UTC+5 (TJT)
- Official languages: Russian (Interethnic); Tajik (State)

Surkhob (Russian: Сурхоб; Tajik: Сурхоб/سرخاب) is a jamoat in Tajikistan. It is located in Lakhsh District, one of the Districts of Republican Subordination. The jamoat has a total population of 2,987 (2015). Villages: Duaghba (the seat), Dashti Murghon, Busholon, Obshoron, Khushhol, Maydonterak.
