= Istiqlol (Lakhsh) =

Istiqlol Истиқлол
- Village and Jamoat
- Location within Tajikistan
- Coordinates: 39°19′N 71°27′E
- Country: Tajikistan
- Region: Districts of Republican Subordination
- District: Lakhsh District

Population (2015)
  - Total: 3,890
- Time zone: UTC+5 (TJT)

Istiqlol (Tajik: Истиқлол, Russian: Истиқлол, formerly Qashot) is a village and jamoat in Tajikistan. It is located in Lakhsh District, one of the Districts of Republican Subordination. The jamoat has a total population of 3,890 (2015). It consists of 4 villages: Dumbrasozon, Sari Pul, Kontoy and Khingsoy.
