= Lakhsh =

- Jamoat
- Location in Tajikistan
- Coordinates: 39°20′N 71°31′E
- Country: Tajikistan
- Region: Districts of Republican Subordination
- District: Lakhsh District

Population (2015)
  - Total: 4,938
- Time zone: UTC+5 (TJT)

Lakhsh (Tajik: Лахш, Persian: لَخش) is a jamoat in Tajikistan. It is located in Lakhsh District in Districts of Republican Subordination region. The jamoat has a total population of 4,938 (2015). It consists of 3 villages: Chorsu (formerly: Jayilgan), Kayondeh and Safeddara.
