= Sayliobod =

Sayloiobod Tajik: Сайлиобод
- Jamoat
- Location within Tajikistan
- Coordinates: 39°21′N 71°34′E
- Country: Tajikistan
- Region: Districts of Republican Subordination
- District: Lakhsh District

Population (2015)
  - Total: 4,467
- Time zone: UTC+5 (TJT)
- Official languages: Russian (Interethnic); Tajik (State)

Sayliobod (formerly Algha; Tajik: Сайлиобод) is a jamoat in Tajikistan. It is located in Lakhsh District, one of the Districts of Republican Subordination. The jamoat has a total population of 4,467 (2015). It consists of five villages, including Mehrobod (the seat), Domanakuh, Gulzoron, Sebiston and Tojvaron
