= Sukhoi S-6 =

Proposed bomber aircraft

S-6
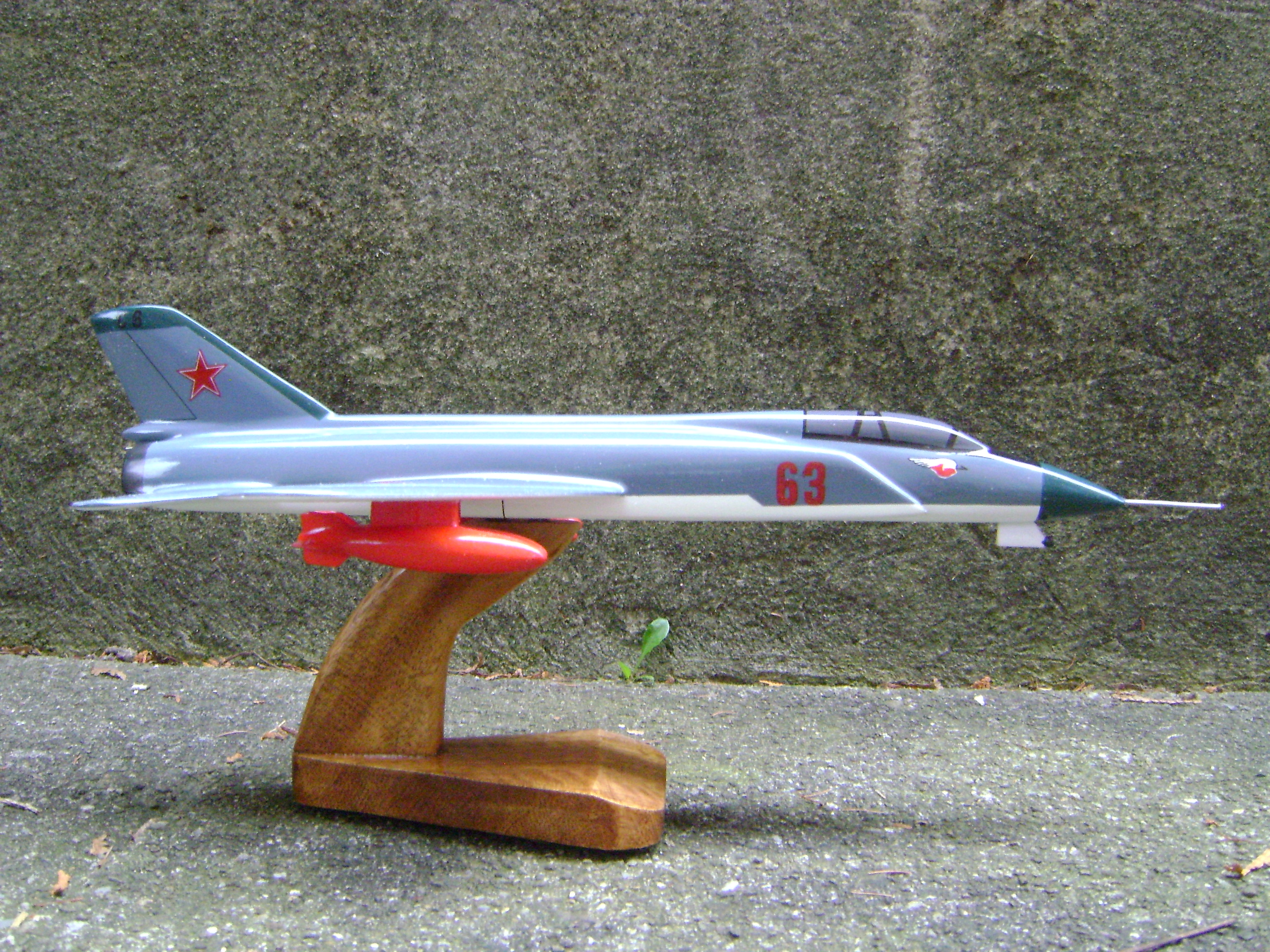
- S-6 Model

General information
- Type: All-weather attack aircraft
- Manufacturer: Sukhoi
- Status: Cancelled
- Number built: 0

History
- Developed from: Sukhoi Su-15
- Developed into: Sukhoi Su-24

The Sukhoi S-6 (Russian Cyrillic:Сухой С-6) was a design proposal for a two-seat tactical bomber which was developed in the Soviet Union. Roughly based on the Su-15U, further development eventually led to the Sukhoi T-6-1 and via the T-6-2 to the Sukhoi Su-24.

== Development ==
In the mid-1960s, the Soviet aviation forces sought a successor to the obsolete Yak-28 and Ilyushin Il-28. Sukhoi's experimental design department was aware of the need to replace these legacy aircraft, but at the time the political leadership of the Soviet Union believed there was a greater need for intercontinental aircraft armed with ballistic and anti-aircraft missiles which could serve as interceptors. Thus, designs for new bombers or ground attack aircraft to replace the Yak-28 and Il-28 were not considered a priority. As a result, the chief engineer Yevgeny Felsner and Oleg S. Samoilovich worked on the S-6 mainly in their spare time. To obtain the necessary resources, the S-6 project was submitted to the authorities as part of modernization of the Sukhoi T-58 (Sukhoi's prototype designation for the Sukhoi Su-15).

== Design ==
The S-6 was to be equipped with the Puma Weapon Computer System, which would include the 'Orion' pulse doppler radar and 'Relief' monopulse ground mapping radar, later incorporated into the Su-24. Powered by 2x 46.1 kN (10,364 lb_{f}) Tumansky R-21F-300 (modified Tumansky R-11F-300), the S-6 would theoretically have been capable of a maximum speed of 1,400 km/h (870 mph; 756 kn) at sea level and 2,500 km/h (1,553 mph; 1,350 kn) at high altitude.

The starting point for the aircraft was the Su-15U, with the weapons system officer seated in the rear cockpit, relieving the pilot of responsibility for the weapon systems. Airbrakes were to have been sited either side of the fin with a brake parachute housed at the extreme rear end of the ventral spine, running the entire length of the fuselage aft of the canopy.

The S-6 was to have a two-wheel nose landing gear and single-wheeled main landing gear, retracting into the fuselage. The large nose with slightly flattened sides housed the ground mapping radar and terrain following radar, with a shovel-shaped combined laser / infrared sensor, which also included the data transmission for the anti-radar weapons like the Kh-24, mounted below and behind the radome on a forward swept pylon. The most striking visual feature of the S-6 design, however, was its rectangular air intakes, which were raked rearwards from the lower lips.

=== T-58M ===
Assessment of a full-scale model and development of subsystems (notably the Puma-S weapon system), revealed that the requirements in terms of range, weapon loading and field aerodrome capability could only be met by the S-6 when fitted with RATOG, but still outshone the competition for Mikoyan Guryevitch with their project based on the MiG-25.

The military then demanded a larger weapon load, which led Sukhoi to propose a less advanced derivative of the T-58 as the T-58M, which had four weapon stations on the fuselage versus the S-6's single weapon station. Due to the greater weight, the main landing gear of the T-58M was equipped with two wheels to operate on unpaved runways. The T-58M was to have had an extended fuselage, twin wheel main landing gear, the same radar system as the S-6, a continuous spine from the cockpit to the brake screen container under the rudder and half-round air inlets with adjustable diffuser cones, resembling the Lavochkin La-250.

However, the T-58M also failed to meet military demands for maximum speed and weight on the one hand and STOL capability for operation on semi-prepared runways. Also, the required performance of the radar system could not be met due to the limitations of the fuselage cross-section / antenna size. At that time, the use of vertical jet engines in East and West seemed a promising solution to shorten take-off and landing distances. Sukhoi's experience with the technology demonstrator T-58VD (a T-58 prototype equipped with three Rybinsk RD-36-35 lift-jets), led them to improve STOL performance with lift engines, widening the fuselage and in turn, allowing a larger radome to accommodate a larger radar antennae. The sensor attached to the pylon under the radome on the S-6 could now be installed in the nose and the widened fuselage also gave the opportunity for a side by side cockpit, increasing the efficiency of the crew.

=== T-6 ===
In a progression from the S-6 and T-58M the prototype fixed-wing Sukhoi T-6-1 was built, with rectangular air inlets, similar to the Sukhoi Su-24 and lift-jets in the fuselage. Sukhoi's good experiences with development of the Sukhoi Su-7IG with variable-sweep wings, led them to fit swing-wings on the T-6 due to the overall better trade-off with weight, and fuel consumption, resulting in the T-6-2 prototypes of the production Su-24.

=== Armament ===
The S-6 was to have a Gryazev-Shipunov GSh-6-23 cannon, two weapon stations on each wing, one on the fuselage centre-line and two more under the rear fuselage. The outboard pylons and the centre-line pylon would have been plumbed for drop-tanks. The rear fuselage stations were only usable for booster rockets or unguided free-fall bombs. Proposed weapons were conventional free-fall bombs, heavy unguided air-to-surface rockets, pods for the lighter S-5 rockets, Kh-24 anti-radar missiles, and tactical nuclear weapons, up to a maximum weapon load of 3,000 kg (6,614 lb).
