= Lakhshi Bolo =

Lakhshi Bolo Лахши Боло
- Jamoat
- Location within Tajikistan
- Coordinates: 39°14′N 71°31′E
- Country: Tajikistan
- Region: Districts of Republican Subordination
- District: Lakhsh District

Population (2015)
  - Total: 10,501
- Time zone: UTC+5 (TJT)

Lakhshi Bolo (Tajik: Лахши Боло, Russian: Лакши Боло, formerly Muqsu) is a jamoat in Tajikistan. It is located in Lakhsh District, one of the Districts of Republican Subordination. The jamoat has a total population of 10,501 (2015). It consists of seven villages, including Lakhsh (the seat), Mugh, Zarrinrud, Samarmand, Chashmasor, Shirinob and Chorgul.
