= Bort number =

Russian military aircraft marking

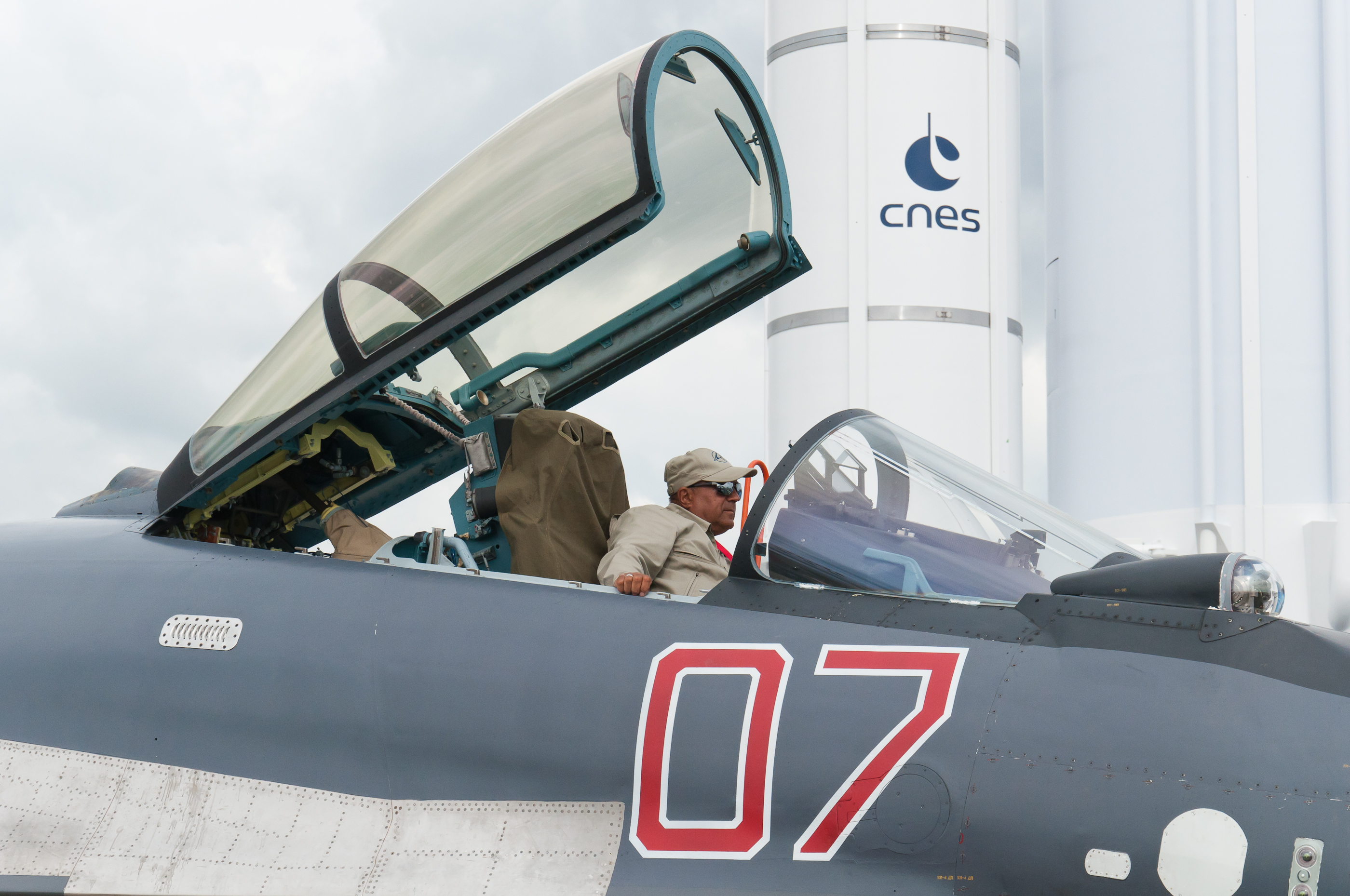
Su-35S displays bort number "07 red"

Bort numbers are markings usually found on the side of the fuselage of Soviet (and later Russian) military aircraft that help identify the aircraft's unit and/or base assignment. In Russian use, the bort number is analogous to the United States' military tail code system and does not provide unique aircraft identification.

== Use in Soviet Union and Russia ==
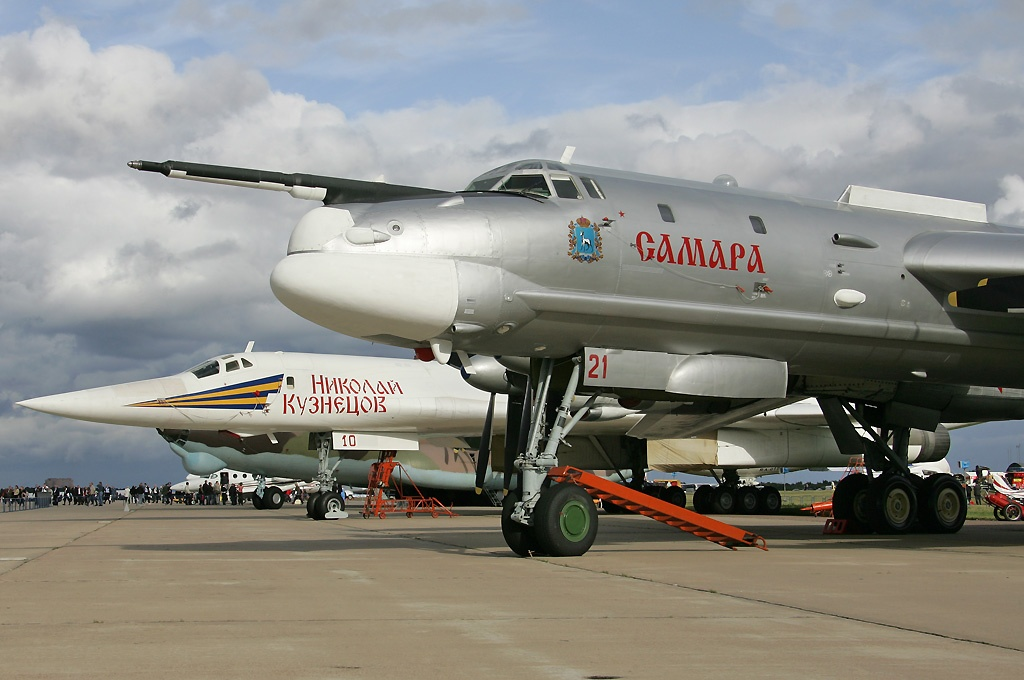
Tu-95 "21 red" and Tu-160 "10 red" display bort numbers on their nose wheel doors

The use of bort numbers to identify Soviet aircraft within specific squadrons dates to World War II, however the modern system of applying bort numbers was not formalized until 1975. The modern bort number format consists of a two-digit number which is most commonly red, but may also be blue or yellow. On all aircraft except bombers, the bort number is shown on the side of the fuselage, typically near the cockpit. On bombers the bort number is shown on the vertical stabilizer and nose wheel door.

Bort numbers serve the same purpose as the US military tail code system: to provide a means to identify a specific aircraft in a squadron without the use of the aircraft's serial number. Unlike the tail code system, bort numbers are not unique to a given aircraft, often change over time, and are not attributable to a certain base or squadron without additional context.

Bort numbers are assigned by the local airbase commander, with a few common rules:

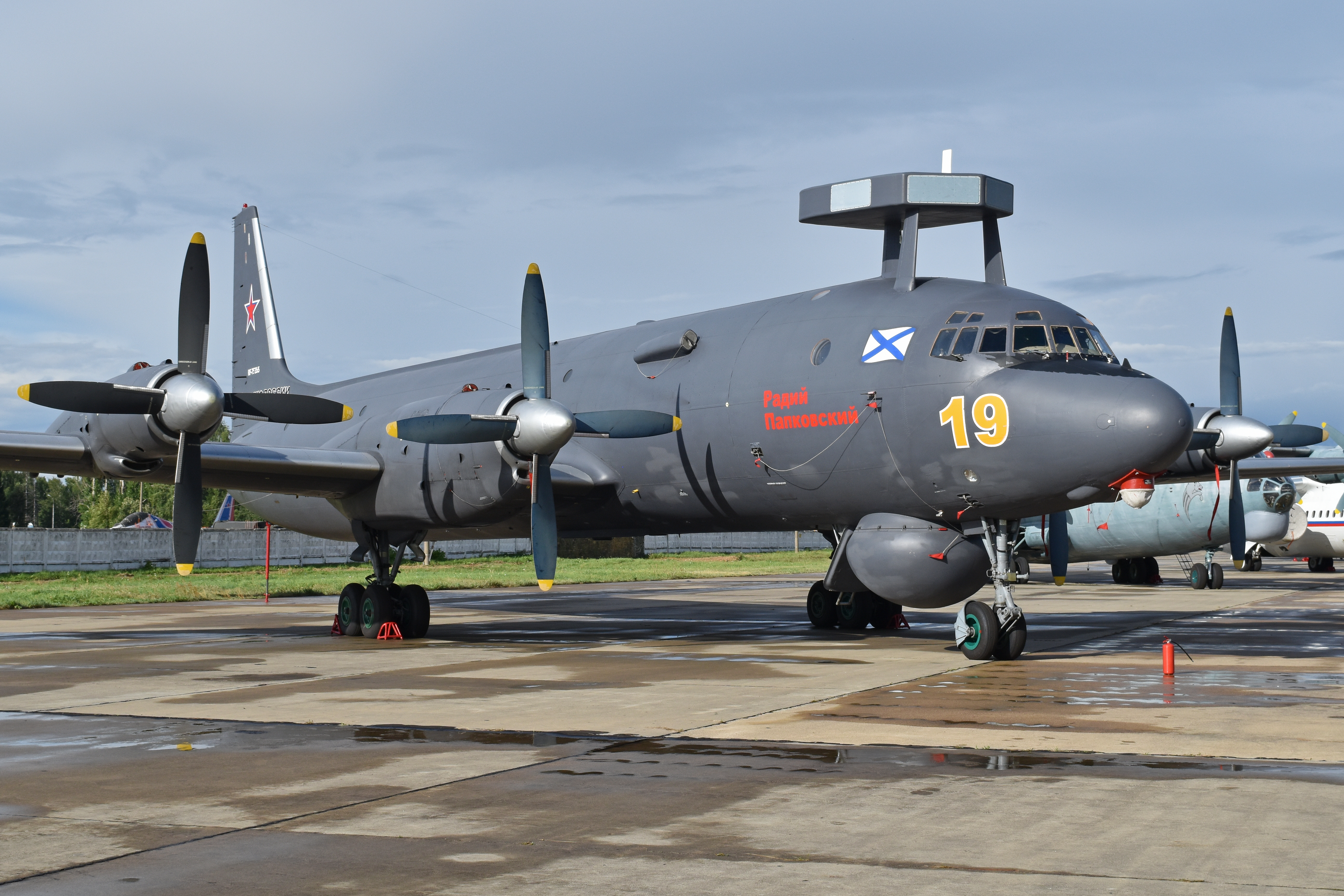
- IL-38N "19 yellow" displays a rare yellow bort number
  All aircraft at a given base must have the same bort number color.
- The bort number must be in the range of 01 - 99, but numbers may be repeated if there are more than 100 aircraft at a given base.
- Squadrons at the same base should not have sequential numbers. For example, one squadron may be allotted the numbers 05 - 16 and 43 - 72 while another may have 21 - 35 and 81 - 99.

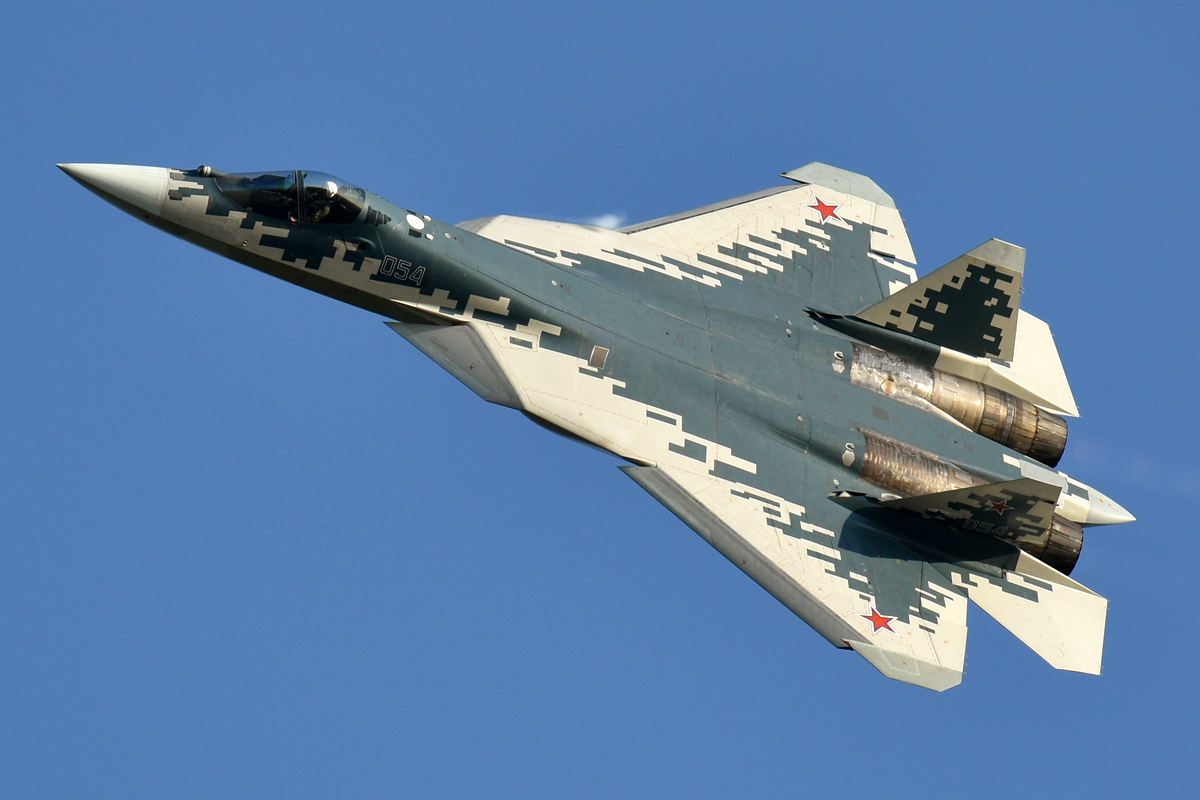
The fourth Su-57 prototype displays the 3-digit bort number "054 blue"

A prototype aircraft may be assigned a unique and stable 3-digit bort number during testing. The 3-digit bort number will be replaced by the standard two-digit format if the aircraft is subsequently assigned to an operational unit. In the case of the Su-57 these bort numbers have been assigned sequentially, with the first aircraft assigned "051 blue" and the second "052 blue" (and so on).

== See also ==
- Tail code
- Buzz number
