= RBK-500 =

Russian cluster bomb

RBK-500 is a Russian 500 kg cluster bomb. It carries 15 "Motiv-3" SPBE-D antitank submunitions developed by NPO Bazalt with dual-mode infrared homing system. It entered service with the Soviet Air Force in 1987.

In November 2023, during the Russo-Ukrainian war, Russian forces reportedly began deploying RBK-500s fitted with Unifitsirovannyi Modul Planirovaniya i Korrektsii (UMPK) standoff glide bomb kits against Ukrainian forces in Donetsk Oblast, near Staromaiorske. It was the first time RBK-500s fitted with UMPKs were seen being used on publicly-available video.
