= Nav/attack system =

A nav/attack system (short for navigation/attack system) is an integrated suite of sensors and navigation equipment that allows a military aircraft to locate and attack specific ground targets or conduct aerial reconnaissance with a high degree of precision.

Since the late 1950s, nav/attack systems helped pilots increase the accuracy of releasing ordnance. A computer program would record the aircraft's velocity and use it to pinpoint their location in relationship with the target's location. Early integrated nav/attack systems suffered from poor reliability. Improvements in digital computing technology, advent of the microchip, have resulted in substantially more sophisticated and effective equipment.

A typical modern nav/attack system is based around an inertial navigation system (INS) that allows the aircrew to locate the target area without relying on active sensors such as radar that might alert enemy combatants. INS can help calculate "drift", changes in course that deviate from the target, the nav/attack system can guide the aircraft to the target or be used as a tool to help guide the pilot to the target.

Modern systems typically provide an automatic weapons release; the aircraft can be programmed to release the ordnance before it misses the target. The aircraft's computer system will release the ordnance unless the pilot chooses to override that command and release it instead. The navigation program accounts for factors such as wind and velocity. Early nav/attack systems were primitive but paved the way for the systems we have today. Today's systems give pilots deadlier accuracy because of technological advances that have developed since the first model.
