= Lakhsh District =

Lakhsh District Ноҳияи Лахш (Tajik)
- District
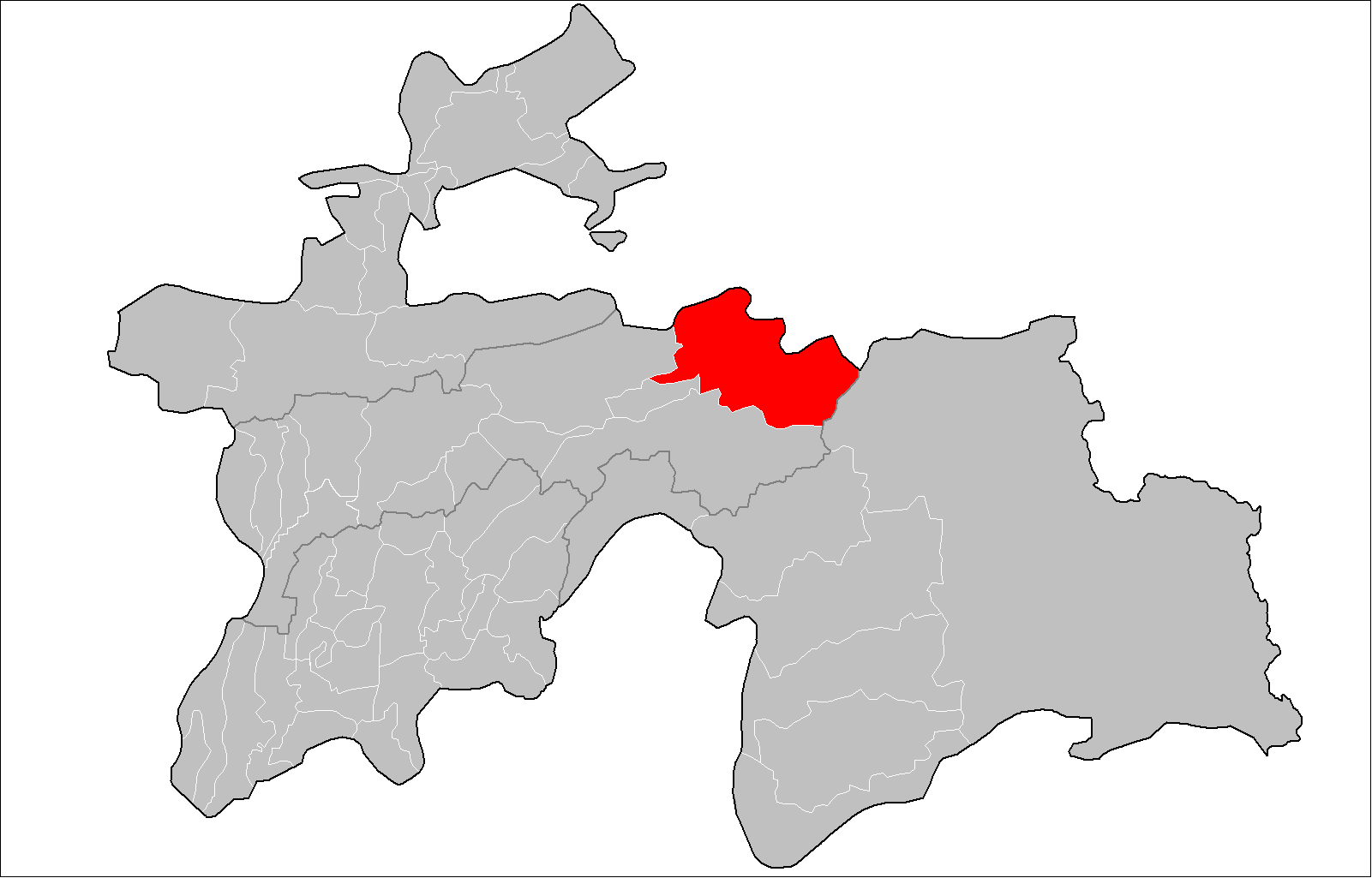
- Location of Lakhsh District in Tajikistan
- Coordinates: 39°15′N 71°30′E
- Country: Tajikistan
- Region: Districts of Republican Subordination
- Capital: Vahdat

Area
  - Total: 4,600 km^{2} (1,800 sq mi)

Population (2020)
  - Total: 66,400
- Time zone: UTC+5 (TJT)
- Official languages: Russian (Interethnic); Tajik (State)

Lakhsh District (Tajik: Ноҳияи Лахш, Kyrgyz: Жерге-Тал ооданы, before 2016: Jirgatol District) is a district in Tajikistan. It lies in the extreme north-east corner of the Districts of Republican Subordination. Its northern boundary is the international boundary with Kyrgyzstan; on the south it borders with Sangvor and Tojikobod districts, and its western border is with Rasht District. Its capital is the town Vahdat (formerly: Jirgatol). The population of Lakhsh district is 64,400 (1 January 2020 estimate).

== Administrative divisions ==
The district has an area of about 4,600 km^{2} (2,000 sq mi) and is divided administratively into one town and nine jamoats. They are as follows:

Jamoat	Population (Jan. 2015)
Vahdat (town)	5,900
Sayliobod	4,467
Navruz	9,219
Istiqlol	3,890
Lakhsh	4,938
Lakhshi Bolo	10,501
Pildon	7,790
Sarital	3,353
Surkhob	2,987
Nurafshon	6,442
