= Oslo Conference =

Oslo Conference may refer to:

- Oslo Conference on Cluster Munitions, international diplomatic event held on 22-23 February 2007.
- International Conference on Nuclear Disarmament, Oslo, 2008, international diplomatic event held on 26-27 February 2008.
- Oslo Conference on the humanitarian impact of nuclear weapons, international diplomatic event held on 4-5 March 2013.
