= Nayarit Conference =

Multilateral conference on the impact of nuclear weapons

The Nayarit Conference was an international diplomatic event held on 13–14 February 2014 in Nuevo Vallarta, Nayarit, Mexico. It was the second multilateral conference in a series examining the humanitarian consequences of nuclear weapons, following the 2013 Oslo Conference and preceding the 2014 Vienna Conference. The conference was hosted by the Government of Mexico, and was attended by 147 states, several United Nations agencies, the International Committee of the Red Cross, and various civil society organizations such as the International Campaign to Abolish Nuclear Weapons.

== Background ==
Working paper submitted by Mexico for the Preparatory Committee for the 2015 Review Conference of the Parties to the Treaty on the Non-Proliferation of Nuclear Weapons

Before the conference, nuclear disarmament discussions were mostly conducted under arms control and non-proliferation frameworks. In the 2010 NPT Review Conference, states formally expressed their "deep concern at the catastrophic humanitarian consequences of any use of nuclear weapons". Growing frustration at the slow pace of disarmament made non-nuclear-weapon states and civil society to adopt a humanitarian approach.

After the Oslo Conference, Mexico, as host, sought to continue on this dialogue and to explore possible legal and political frameworks for achieving a world free of nuclear weapons. Symbolically, the Nayarit Conference was held on the anniversary of the 1967 signing of the Treaty of Tlatelolco, whereby Latin America and the Caribbean was declared a nuclear-weapon-free zone.

== Objectives ==
The main objectives of the conference were:

- Human health and medical response capacity
- Environmental and climatic consequences
- Socioeconomic disruption and food security
- The inability of the international community to effectively respond to a nuclear detonation

Unlike in Oslo, discussions in Nayarit shifted towards political implications, emphasizing the need for concrete steps toward prohibition and elimination. It included presentations about the risks involved in having nuclear weapons, a subject which was not covered before.

== Outcome ==
The conference concluded with a strong momentum for advancing from humanitarian analysis to political and legal action. States and civil society actors called for a treaty to prohibit nuclear weapons. The Chair's summary, delivered by Juan Manuel Gómez Robledo of Mexico's Secretariat of Foreign Affairs (SRE), laid out that the effects of a nuclear weapon detonation are "not constrained by national borders − it is therefore an issue of deep concern shared by all".
