= Cluster munition =

Explosive weapon with small submunitions

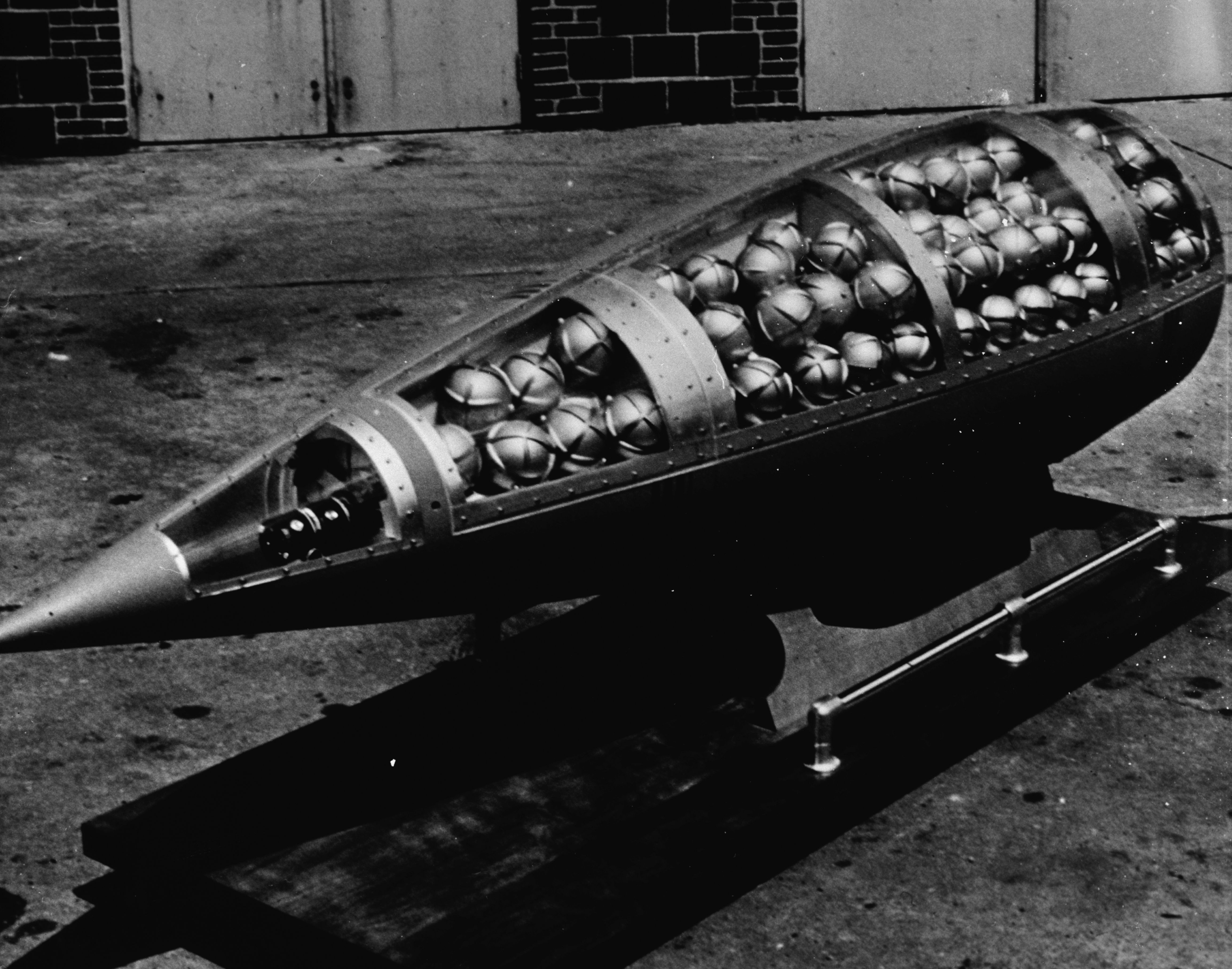
US Honest John missile warhead cutaway around 1960, showing M134 bomblets filled with sarin

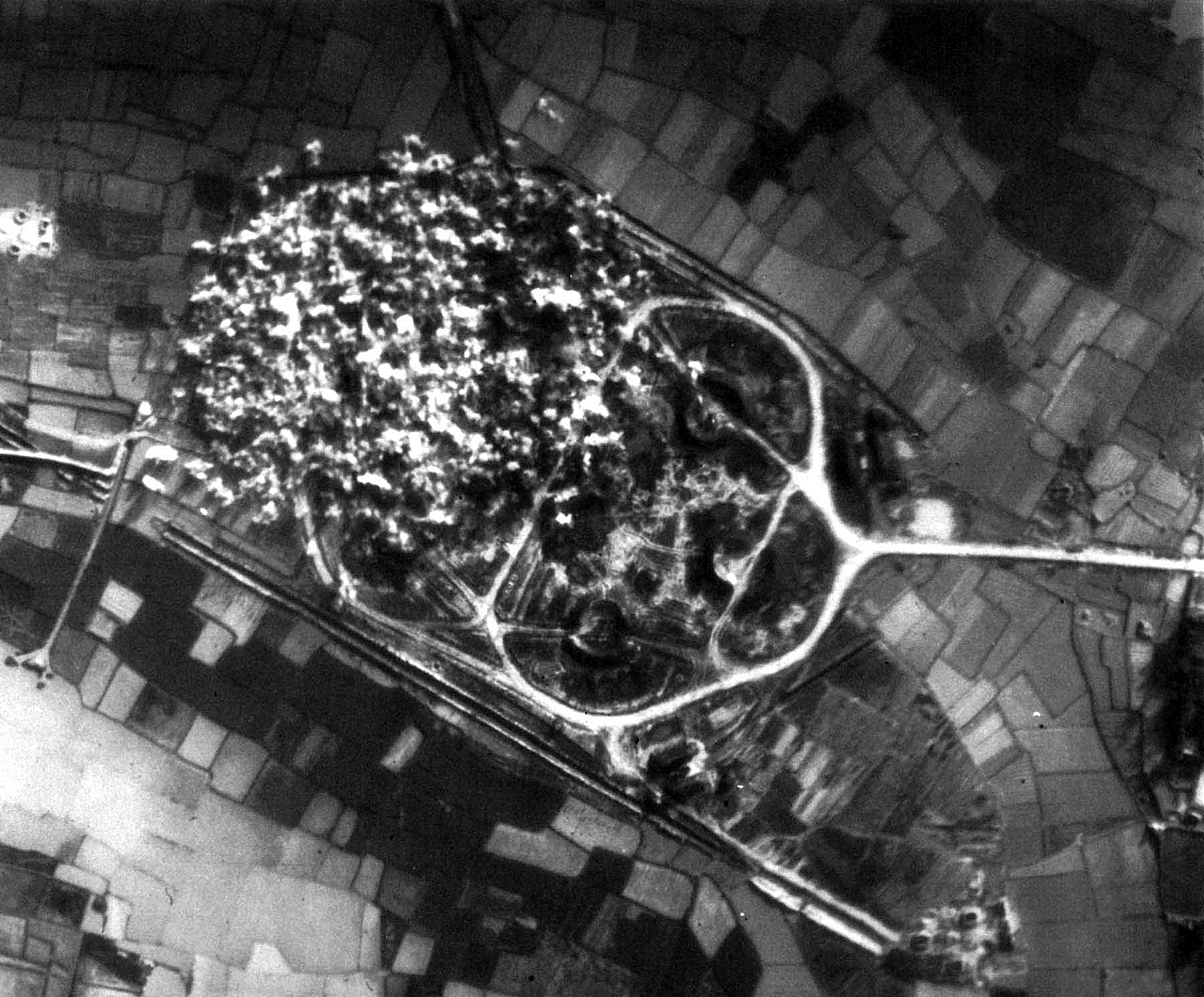
Half of a surface-to-air missile site in North Vietnam blanketed in exploding bomblets dispersed by a US cluster munition, Vietnam War

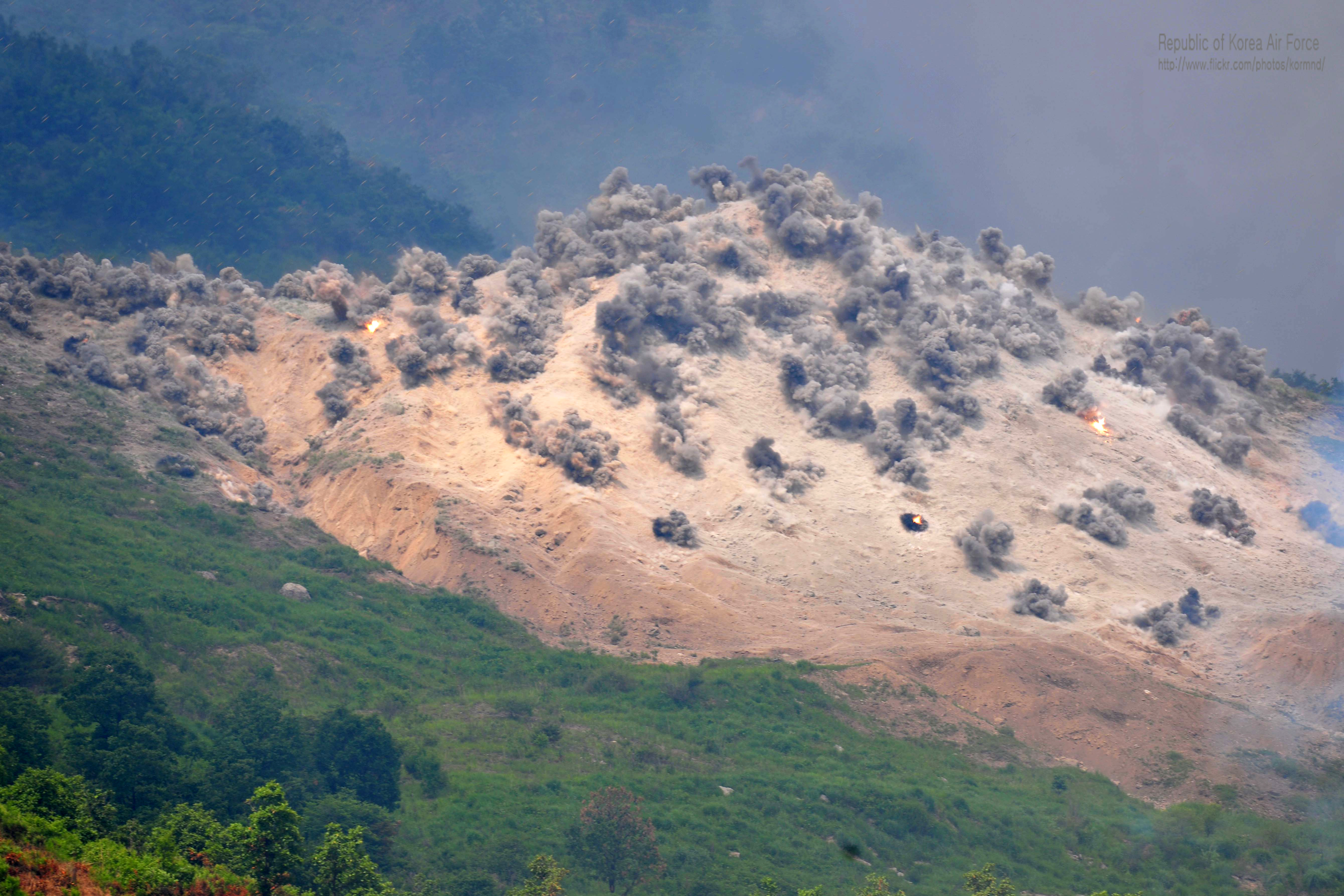
A cluster bomb is dropped at the Nightmare Range in South Korea

A cluster munition is a form of air-dropped or ground-launched explosive weapon that releases or ejects smaller submunitions. Most cluster munitions are designed to kill enemy personnel or destroy vehicles, but some are designed to destroy runways or electric power transmission lines.

Because cluster bombs release many small bomblets over a wide area, they pose risks to civilians both during attacks and afterwards. Unexploded bomblets can kill or maim civilians and unintended targets long after a conflict has ended and are costly to locate and remove. This failure rate ranges from two percent to over 40 percent.

Cluster munitions are prohibited for those nations that ratified the Convention on Cluster Munitions, adopted in Dublin, Ireland, in May 2008. The Convention entered into force and became binding international law upon ratifying states on 1 August 2010, six months after being ratified by 30 states. As of 10 February 2022, a total of 123 states have joined the Convention, as 110 states parties and 13 signatories.

== Development ==
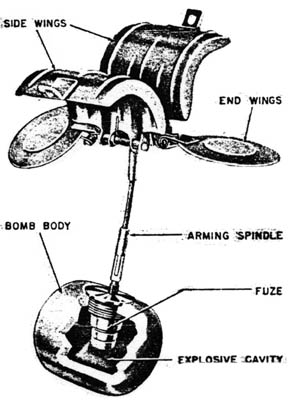
SD2 Butterfly Bomb circa 1940. Wings rotate as bomb falls, unscrewing the arming spindle connected to the fuze.

The first significantly operationally used cluster bomb was the German SD-2 or Sprengbombe Dickwandig 2 kg, commonly referred to as the Butterfly Bomb. Cluster munitions were used in World War II to attack both civilian and military targets, including Tokyo and Kyushu. The technology was developed independently by the United States, Russia and Italy (see Thermos bomb). The US used the 9-kilogram (20 lb) M41 fragmentation bomb wired together in clusters of six or 25 with highly sensitive or proximity fuzes.

From the 1970s to the 1990s a wide variety of cluster bombs became standard air-dropped munitions for many nations. They have been produced by 34 countries and used in at least 23.

Artillery shells that employ similar principles have existed for decades. They are typically referred to as ICM (Improved Conventional Munitions) shells. The US military slang terms for them are "firecracker" or "popcorn" shells, for the many small explosions they cause in the target area.

== Types ==
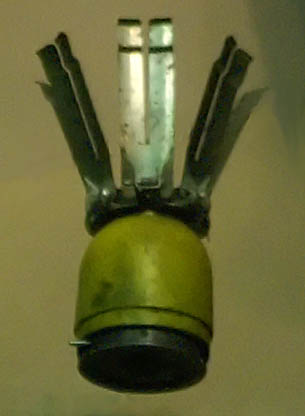
A US Vietnam era BLU-3 cluster bomblet

A basic cluster bomb consists of a hollow shell and then two to more than 2,000 submunitions or bomblets contained within it. Some are dispensers designed to be retained by the aircraft after releasing their munitions. The submunitions themselves may be fitted with small parachute retarders or streamers to slow their descent (allowing the aircraft to escape the blast area in low-altitude attacks).

Modern cluster bombs and submunition dispensers can be multiple-purpose weapons containing a combination of anti-armor, anti-personnel, and anti-material munitions. The submunitions themselves may also be multi-purpose, such as combining a shaped charge, to attack armour, with a fragmenting case, to attack infantry, material, and light vehicles. They may also have an incendiary function.

Since the 1990s submunition-based weapons have been designed that deploy smart submunitions, using thermal and visual sensors to locate and attack particular targets, usually armored vehicles. Weapons of this type include the US CBU-97 sensor-fuzed weapon, first used in combat during Operation Iraqi Freedom, the 2003 invasion of Iraq. Some munitions specifically intended for anti-tank use can be set to self-destruct if they reach the ground without locating a target, theoretically reducing the risk of unintended civilian deaths and injuries. Although smart submunition weapons are much more expensive than standard cluster bombs, fewer smart submunitions are required to defeat dispersed and mobile targets, partly offsetting their cost. Because they are designed to prevent indiscriminate area effects and unexploded ordnance risks, some smart munitions are excluded from coverage by the Convention on Cluster Munitions.

=== Incendiary ===
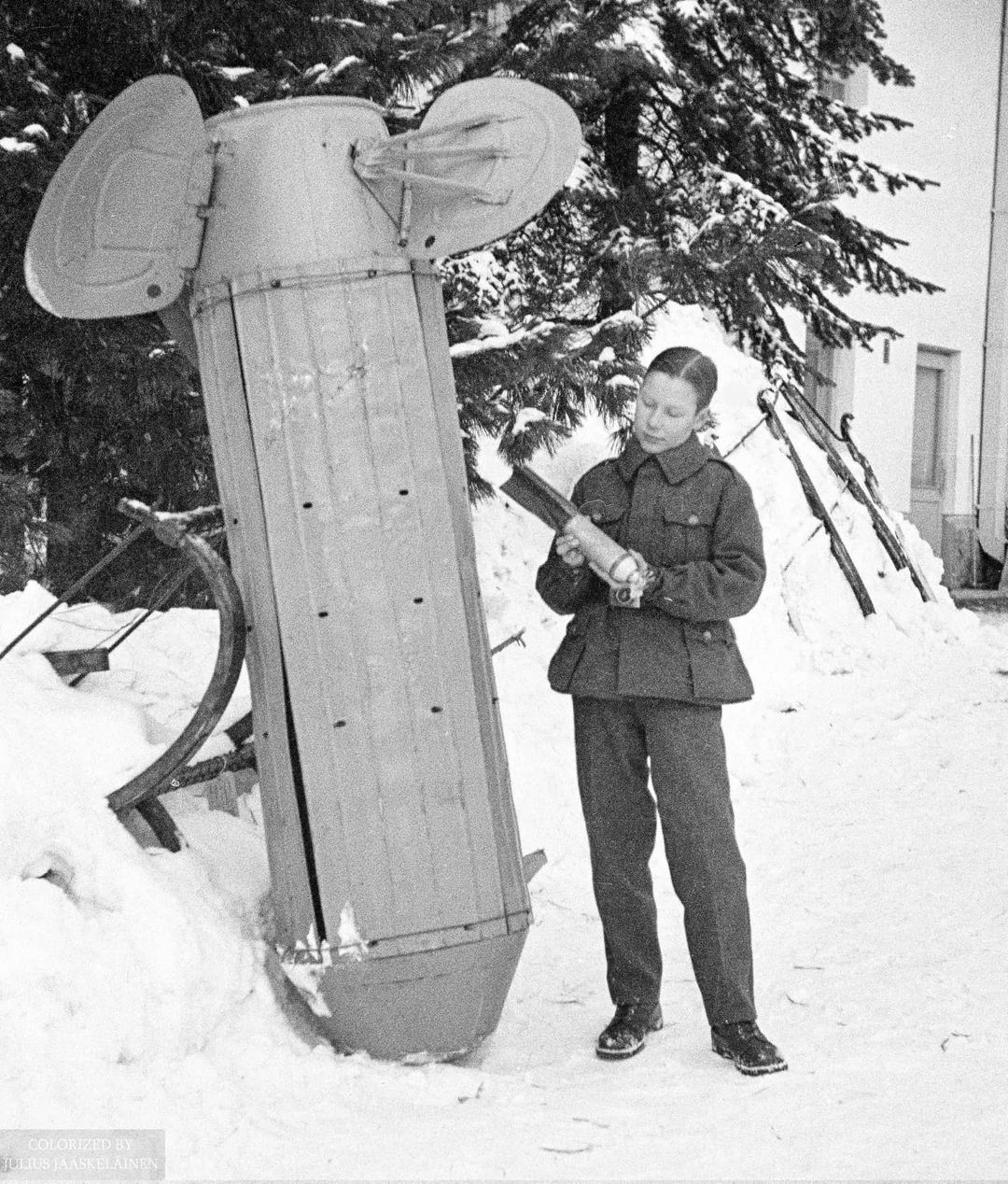
During the Winter War of 1939–1940, the Soviet Union dropped RRAB-3, nicknamed Molotov bread baskets, which scattered incendiary bomblets, on Finland.

Incendiary cluster bombs are intended to start fires, just like conventional incendiary bombs (firebombs). They contain submunitions of white phosphorus or napalm, and can be combined anti-personnel and anti-tank submunitions to hamper firefighting efforts. In urban areas they have been preceded by the use of conventional explosive bombs to fracture the roofs and walls of buildings to expose their flammable contents. One of the earliest examples is the so-called Molotov bread basket used by the Soviet Union in the Winter War of 1939–40. Incendiary clusters were extensively used by both sides in the strategic bombings of World War II. They caused firestorms and conflagrations in the bombing of Dresden in World War II and the firebombing of Tokyo. Some modern bomb submunitions deliver a highly combustible thermobaric aerosol that results in a high pressure explosion when ignited, including the CBU-55 used by the United States Armed Forces during the Vietnam War and the CBU-72 used during the Gulf War.

=== Anti-personnel ===
Anti-personnel cluster bombs use explosive fragmentation to kill troops and destroy soft (unarmored) targets. Along with incendiary cluster bombs, these were among the first types of cluster bombs produced by Nazi Germany during World War II. They were used during the Blitz with delay and booby-trap fusing to hamper firefighting and other damage-control efforts. They were also used with a contact fuze when attacking entrenchments. These weapons were widely used during the Vietnam War when many thousands of tons of submunitions were dropped on Laos, Cambodia and Vietnam.

=== Anti-tank ===
Most anti-armor munitions contain shaped-charge warheads to pierce the armor of tanks and armored fighting vehicles. In some cases, guidance is used to increase the likelihood of successfully hitting a vehicle. Modern guided submunitions, such as those found in the US CBU-97, can use either a shaped charge or an explosively formed penetrator. Unguided shaped-charge submunitions are designed to be effective against entrenchments that incorporate overhead cover. To simplify supply and increase battlefield effectiveness by allowing a single type of round to be used against nearly any target, submunitions that incorporate both fragmentation and shaped-charge effects are produced.

=== Anti-electrical ===
An anti-electrical weapon, the CBU-94/B, was first used by the US in the Kosovo War in 1999. These consist of a TMD (Tactical Munitions Dispenser) filled with 202 submunitions. Each submunition contains a small explosive charge that disperses 147 reels of fine conductive fiber of either carbon or aluminum-coated glass. Their purpose is to disrupt and damage electric power transmission systems by producing short circuits in high-voltage power lines and electrical substations. On the initial attack, these knocked out 70% of the electrical power supply in Serbia.

== History of use ==
=== Vietnam War ===
During the Vietnam War, the US used cluster bombs in air strikes against targets in Vietnam, Laos, and Cambodia.

Of the 260 million cluster bomblets dropped on Laos between 1964 and 1973, particularly on Xieng Khouang province, 80 million failed to explode. As of 2009, about 7,000 people have been injured or killed by explosives left from the Vietnam War era in Vietnam's Quảng Trị province alone.

The Royal United Services Institute (RUSI) released a study in 2023 citing the use of cluster munitions from the Vietnam War. United States Army studies from that war showed that approximately 13.6 high-explosive 155mm shells were expended for each enemy soldier killed. Conversely, only an average of 1.7 155mm DPICMs shells were required to achieve the same result. RUSI used an example of a trench, where a direct hit by a high explosive round will spread shrapnel "within line of sight of the point of detonation". This also reduces the wear and tear on artillery barrels.

=== South Lebanon conflict, 1978 ===
During the South Lebanon conflict in 1978, the IDF used cluster bombs provided by the United States. According to US President Jimmy Carter, this use of the cluster bombs violated the legal agreement between Israel and the US because the weapons had been provided for defensive purposes against an attack on Israel. Israel also transferred American weapons to Saad Haddad's Lebanese militia, a violation of American law. Carter's administration prepared to notify Congress that American weapons were being used illegally, which would have resulted in military aid to Israel being cut off. The American consul in Jerusalem informed the Israeli government of their plans and, according to Carter, Prime Minister Begin said that the operation was over.

=== Western Sahara war, 1975–1991 ===
During the 16-year-long conflict on the territory of Western Sahara, the Royal Moroccan Army (RMA) dropped cluster bombs.

The RMA used both artillery-fired and air-dropped cluster munitions. BLU-63, M42 and MK118 submunitions were used at multiple locations in Bir Lahlou, Tifarity, Mehaires, Mijek and Awganit.

More than 300 cluster strike areas have been recorded in the MINURSO Mine Action Coordination Center database.

=== Soviet–Afghan War, 1979–1989 ===
During the Soviet-Afghan War, the Soviets dealt harshly with Mujaheddin rebels and those who supported them, including leveling entire villages to deny safe havens to their enemy and the usage of cluster bombs.

=== Falklands War ===
Sea Harriers of the Royal Navy dropped BL755 cluster bombs on Argentinian positions during the Falklands War of 1982.

=== Grenada, 1983 ===
The United States dropped 21 Rockeye cluster bombs during its invasion of Grenada.

=== Nagorno Karabakh War, 1992–1994, 2016, 2020 ===
The armed conflict between Azerbaijan and Armenia in Nagorno Karabakh in 1992–1994 led to the use of cluster munitions against military and civilian targets in the region. As of 2010, 93 km^{2} (36 sq mi) remain off-limits due to contamination with unexploded cluster ordnance. HALO Trust has made major contributions to the cleanup effort.

During renewed hostilities in April 2016, HALO Trust reported the use of cluster bombs by Azerbaijan, having found cluster munitions in the villages of Nerkin Horatagh and Kiçik Qarabəy. Azerbaijan reported that the Armenian forces had used cluster munition against Azerbaijani civilians in the given period.

According to the Cluster Munition Monitor report in 2010, neither Armenia nor Azerbaijan not acceded to become a member of the Convention on Cluster Munitions.

Further use of cluster munition was reported during the 2020 Nagorno-Karabakh war. The Armenian-populated city of Stepanakert came under bombardment throughout the war, beginning on the first day. Human Rights Watch reported that residential neighborhoods in Stepanakert which lacked any identifiable military targets were hit by the Azerbaijani Army with cluster munitions. Human Rights Watch also identified Azerbaijani usage of cluster munitions in Hadrut. Human Rights Watch also reported the use of cluster munitions by the Armenian forces during the months-long bombardment of Tartar, missile attacks on Barda and on Goranboy. Amnesty International also confirmed that the Armenian forces had used cluster munitions in Barda, which resulted in the deaths of 25 Azerbaijani civilians, according to Azerbaijan.

=== First Chechen War, 1995 ===
- Used by Russia, see also 1995 Shali cluster bomb attack

=== Yugoslavia, 1999 ===
- Used by the US, the UK and Netherlands.

About 2,000 cluster bombs containing 380,000 sub-munitions were dropped on Yugoslavia during the 1999 NATO bombing of Yugoslavia. Of these, 531 were RBL755s dropped by the Royal Air Force. Both the Americans and the British utilised cluster bombs.

On 7 May 1999, between 11:30 and 11:40, a NATO attack was carried out with two containers of cluster bombs falling towards central Niš:

- The Pathology building next to the Medical Center of Nis in the south of the city,
- Next to the building of "Banovina" including the main market, bus station next to the Niš Fortress and "12th February" Health Centre
- Parking of "Niš Express" near river Nišava River.

Reports claimed that 15 civilians were killed, 8 civilians were seriously injured, 11 civilians had sustained minor injuries, 120 housing units were damaged and 47 were destroyed and that 15 cars were damaged.

Overall during the operation, at least 23 Serb civilians were killed by cluster munitions. At least six Serbs, including three children were killed by bomblets after the operation ended, and up to 23 square kilometres (8.9 sq mi) in six areas remain "cluster contaminated", according to Serbian government, including on Mt. Kopaonik near the slopes of the ski resort. The UK contributed £86,000 to the Serbian Mine Action Centre.

=== Afghanistan, 2001–2002 ===
- The United States used cluster munitions during the initial stages of Operation Enduring Freedom.

=== Iraq, 1991, 2003–2006 ===
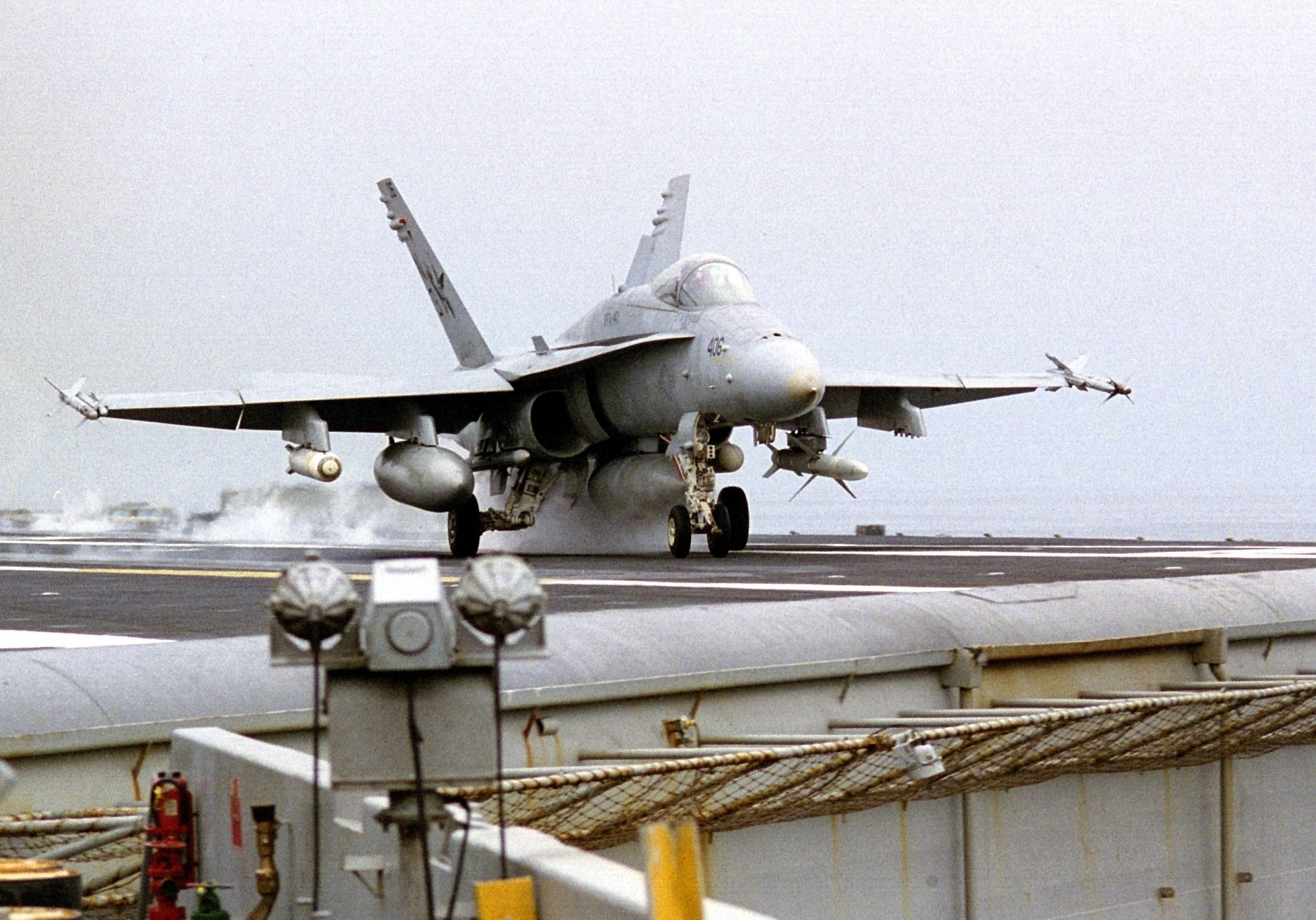
A US Navy F/A-18C Hornet launches from USS Nimitz to a mission in Southern Iraq. Among other weapons, the plane carries CBU-100 "Rockeye" cluster bombs.

- Used by the United States and the United Kingdom

1991: During the Gulf War, the United States, France, and the United Kingdom dropped 61,000 cluster bombs, containing 20 million submunitions, according to Human Rights Watch (HRW). The US accounted for 57,000 of these drops. The US Department of Defense estimated that 1.2 to 1.5 million submunitions did not explode. According to human rights organizations, unexploded submunitions have caused over 4,000 civilian casualties, including 1,600 deaths, in Iraq and Kuwait.

2003–2006: United States and allies attacked Iraq with 13,000 cluster munitions, containing two million submunitions during Operation Iraqi Freedom, according to the HRW. The majority were DPICMs, or dual-purpose improved conventional munitions. At multiple times, coalition forces used cluster munitions in residential areas, and the country remains among the most contaminated to this day, bomblets posing a threat to both US military personnel in the area, and local civilians.

When these weapons were fired on Baghdad on 7 April 2003 many of the bomblets failed to explode on impact. Afterward, some of them exploded when touched by civilians. USA Today reported that "the Pentagon presented a misleading picture during the war of the extent to which cluster weapons were being used and of the civilian casualties they were causing." On 26 April, General Richard Myers, chairman of the Joint Chiefs of Staff, said that the US had caused only one civilian casualty.

=== Georgia, 2008 ===
- Georgia and Russia both were accused of using cluster munitions during the 2008 Russo-Georgian War. Georgia admitted use; Russia denied it.

Georgia admitted using cluster bombs during the war, according to Human Rights Watch but stressed they were only used against military targets. The Georgian army used LAR-160 multiple rocket launchers to fire MK4 LAR 160 type rockets (with M-85 bomblets) with a range of 45 kilometers the Georgian Minister of Defense (MoD) said.

Human Rights Watch accused the Russian Air Force of using RBK-250 cluster bombs during the conflict. A high-ranking Russian military official denied use of cluster bombs. The Dutch government, after investigating the death of a Dutch citizen, claimed that a cluster munition was propelled by an 9K720 Iskander tactical missile (used by Russia at the time of conflict, and not used by Georgia).

=== Sri Lanka, 2008/2009 ===
In 2009, the US Department of State prepared a report on incidents in Sri Lanka between January and May 2009 that could constitute violations of international humanitarian law or crimes against humanity. This report documented the use of cluster munitions by Sri Lanka's government forces. Photos and eyewitness accounts described the use of such weapons in several attacks on civilian areas, including an incident on 7 March 2009, in Valayanmadam, where two cluster bombs exploded, causing significant civilian casualties and injuries. The reports suggest that cluster munitions were used in areas declared as safe zones for civilians.

According to Gordon Weiss, who was the spokesperson for the UN in Colombo, the "largest remaining functioning hospital" in the Vanni region of Sri Lanka was bombed. The Sri Lankan military has been accused of bombing the hospital with cluster munitions, but cluster bombs were not used in the bombing of the hospital. The government has denied using cluster munitions, but in 2012 unexploded cluster bombs were found, according to Allan Poston, who was the technical advisor for the UN Development Program's mine action group in Sri Lanka. An article published by The Guardian in 2016 provided photographic evidence and testimonies from former de-miners and civilians pointing to the use of Russian-made cluster bombs in areas that the government had declared as "no-fire zones."

=== Libya, 2011 ===
It was reported in April 2011 that Colonel Gaddafi's forces had used cluster bombs in the conflict between government forces and rebel forces trying to overthrow Gaddafi's government, during the battle of Misrata These reports were denied by the government, and the Secretary of State of the US, Hillary Clinton said she was "not aware" of the specific use of cluster or other indiscriminate weapons in Misurata even though a New York Times investigation refuted those claims.

=== Syria, 2012 ===
During the Syrian uprising, a few videos of cluster bombs first appeared in 2011, escalating in frequency near the end of 2012. As HRW reported on 13 October 2012, "Eliot Higgins, who blogs on military hardware and tactics used in Syria under the pseudonym 'Brown Moses', compiled a list of the videos showing cluster munition remnants in Syria's various governorates." The type of bombs have been reported to be RBK-250 cluster bombs with AO-1 SCH bomblets (of Soviet design). Designed by the Soviet Union for use on tank and troop formations, PTAB-2.5M bomblets were used on civilian targets in Mare' in December 2012 by the Syrian government. According to the seventh annual Cluster Munition Report, there is ″compelling evidence″ that Russia has used cluster munitions during their involvement in Syria.

=== South Sudan, 2013 ===
Cluster bomb remnants were discovered by a UN de-mining team in February 2014 on a section of road near the Jonglei state capital, Bor. The strategic town was the scene of heavy fighting, changing hands several times during the South Sudanese Civil War, which erupted in the capital Juba on 15 December 2013 before spreading to other parts of the country. According to UNMAS, the site was contaminated with the remnants of up to eight cluster bombs and an unknown quantity of bomblets.

=== Ukraine, 2014 ===
HRW reported that "Ukrainian government forces used cluster munitions in populated areas in Donetsk city in early October 2014." Also "circumstances indicate that anti-government forces might also have been responsible for the use of cluster munitions".

=== Saudi Arabian-led intervention in Yemen, 2015–2022 ===
British-supplied and US-supplied cluster bombs have been used by Saudi Arabian-led military coalition against Houthi militias in Yemen, according to Human Rights Watch and Amnesty International.

Saudi Arabia is not signatory to the Convention on Cluster Munitions.

=== Ethiopia, 2021 ===
The New York Times journalist Christiaan Triebert revealed that the Ethiopian Air Force bombings of Samre during the Tigray War are evidenced by multiple photos of the tails of Soviet-era cluster bombs, likely RBK-250.

Ethiopia is not signatory to the Convention on Cluster Munitions.

=== Russian invasion of Ukraine, 2022 ===
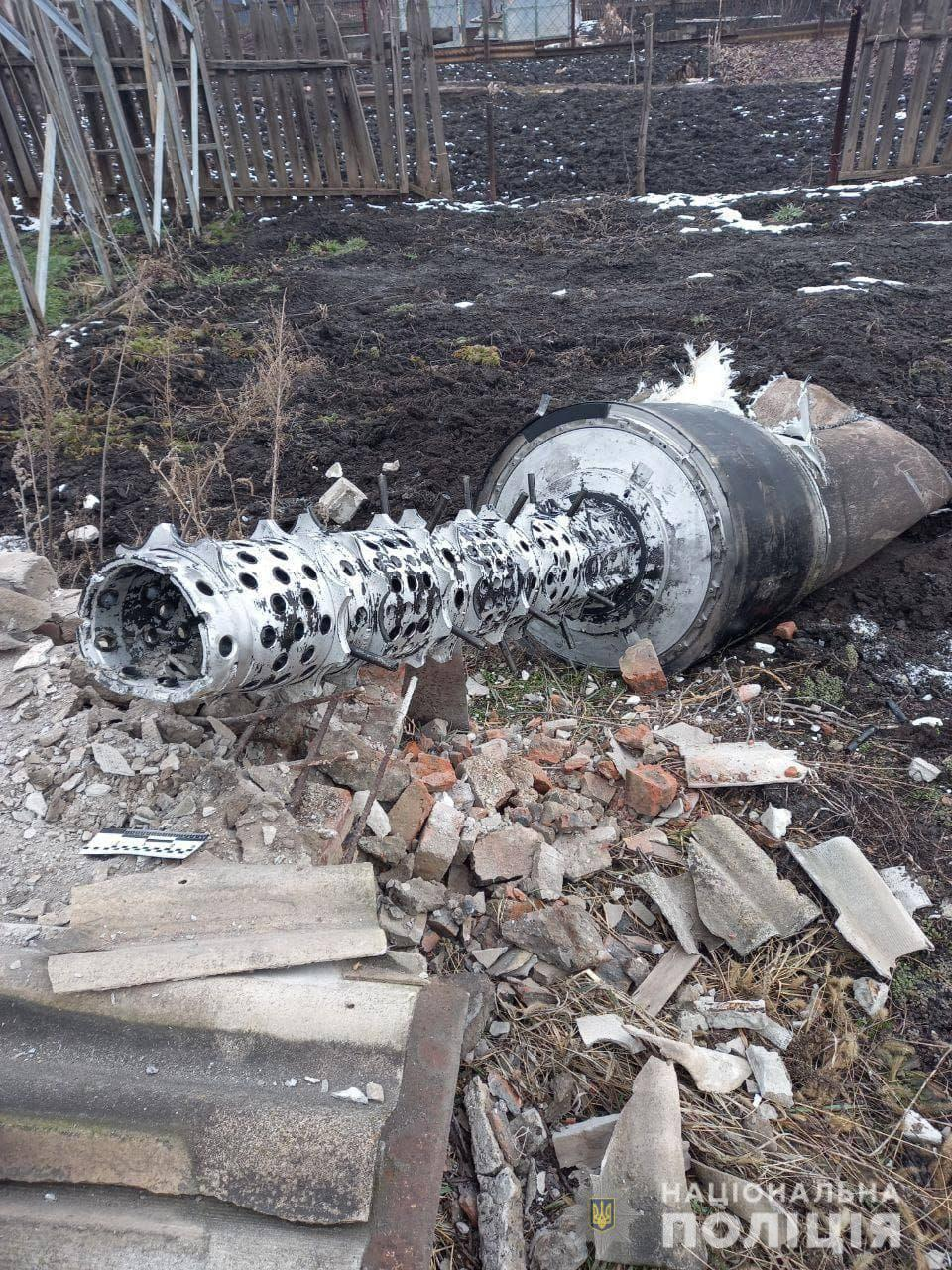
Iskander-M ballistic missile with cluster warhead wreckage that was shot down over Kramatorsk by the Ukrainian air defenses.

HRW reported the use of cluster munitions by the Russian Armed Forces during their invasion of Ukraine. HRMMU reported 16 credible allegations that Russian armed forces used cluster munitions in populated areas, resulting in civilian casualties and other damage.

On 24 February 2022, a Russian 9M79-series Tochka ballistic missile with a 9N123 cluster munition warhead containing 50 9N24 fragmentation submunitions impacted outside a hospital in Vuhledar in Donetsk Oblast, Ukraine. The attack killed four civilians and wounded ten. Further use of cluster munitions, such as the Uragan 9M27K and BM-30 Smerch 9M55K cluster rockets, is being investigated by Bellingcat through a public appeal for evidence on Twitter. According to HRW and Amnesty International, Russian troops used cluster munition during an attack on the city of Okhtyrka on the morning of 25 February 2022. A 220 mm Uragan rocket dropped cluster munitions on a kindergarten in the town, killing several, including a child. The same day, non-precision guided missiles bearing cluster munitions were deployed against Kharkiv, killing at least nine civilians and injuring 37.

The United Nations High Commissioner for Human Rights announced on 30 March 2022 that they had credible reports indicating that Russian armed forces had used cluster munitions in populated areas of Ukraine at least 24 times since the start of the conflict on 24 February.

In early March 2022, The New York Times reported the first use of a cluster munition by Ukrainian troops during the invasion near Husarivka farm. It landed close to the Russian army's headquarters, killing no one.

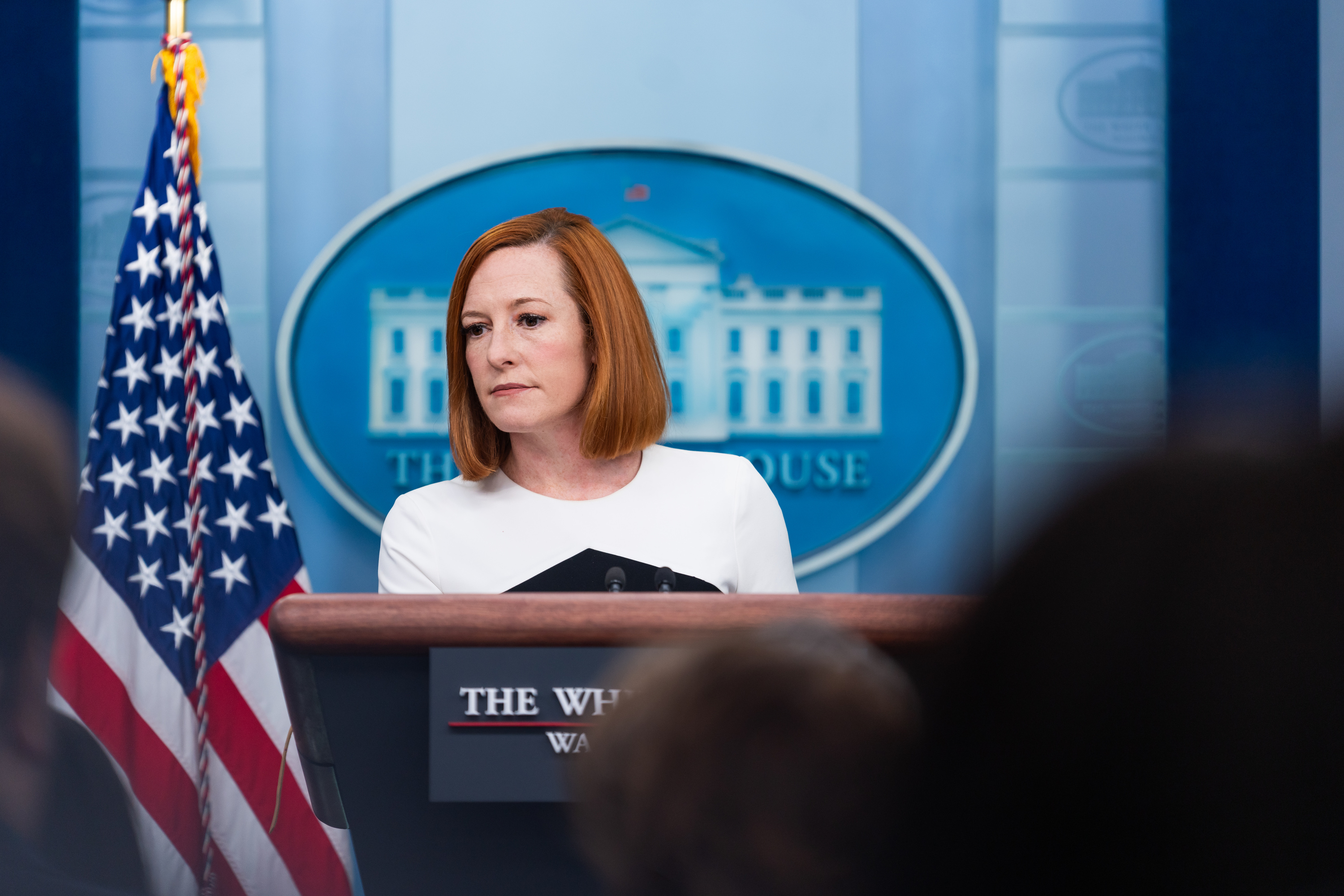
On 28 February 2022, White House press secretary Jen Psaki called Russia's use of cluster munitions a potential "war crime".

On 14 March 2022, an attack with a Tochka-U missile equipped with cluster submunitions was reported in the city of Donetsk. HRMMU confirmed at least 15 civilian deaths, and 36 injured in this incident, and at the time of its report was working to corroborate other alleged casualties and whether they were caused by cluster submunitions.

On 7 December 2022, it was revealed that Ukraine was seeking access to US stockpiles of cluster munitions, due to a shortage of ammunition for HIMARS and 155 mm artillery systems. The US has stockpiled its cluster munitions and had been considering the Ukrainian request. Ukraine claimed it would give them an edge over Russian artillery, as well as preventing depletion of other US and Western stocks.

On 6 July 2023, US president Joe Biden approved the provision of DPICM cluster munitions to Ukraine to help Ukrainian forces with the ongoing counteroffensive to liberate Russian-occupied southeastern Ukraine, bypassing US law prohibiting the transfer of cluster munitions with a failure rate greater than one percent. The weapon system could be used in both HIMARS and 155 mm shells. Defense Department official Laura Cooper said that the munitions "would be useful, especially against dug-in Russian positions on the battlefield." According to the Pentagon, Ukraine will receive an "improved" version of cluster munitions with a failure rate of about 2 percent, while the Russian cluster bombs fail at 40 percent or more. However, according to a report prepared for Congress, experts in cleanup operations "frequently reported failure rates of 10% to 30%." The failure rate of cluster munitions used by Ukraine is reportedly as high as 20 percent. Paul Hannon, of the Cluster Munition Coalition (CMC), said the Biden administration's decision will "contribute to the terrible casualties being suffered by Ukrainian civilians both immediately and for years to come".

On 10 July, Cambodian Prime Minister Hun Sen warned Ukraine of using cluster munitions on Twitter writing: "It would be the greatest danger for Ukrainians for many years or up to a hundred years if cluster bombs are used in Russian-occupied areas in the territory of Ukraine". Sen cited his country's "painful experience" from the Vietnam War that has killed or maimed tens of thousands of Cambodians.

On 16 July 2023, Russian President Vladimir Putin claimed that Russia had "sufficient stockpiles" of its own cluster munitions and threatened to take "reciprocal action" if Ukraine used US-supplied cluster munitions against Russian forces in Ukraine.

On 20 July 2023, The Washington Post reported that Ukrainian forces had begun to use US-supplied cluster munitions against Russian forces in the south-east of the country, according to Ukrainian officials.

=== Lebanon, 1978, 1982, 2006 and 2024 ===
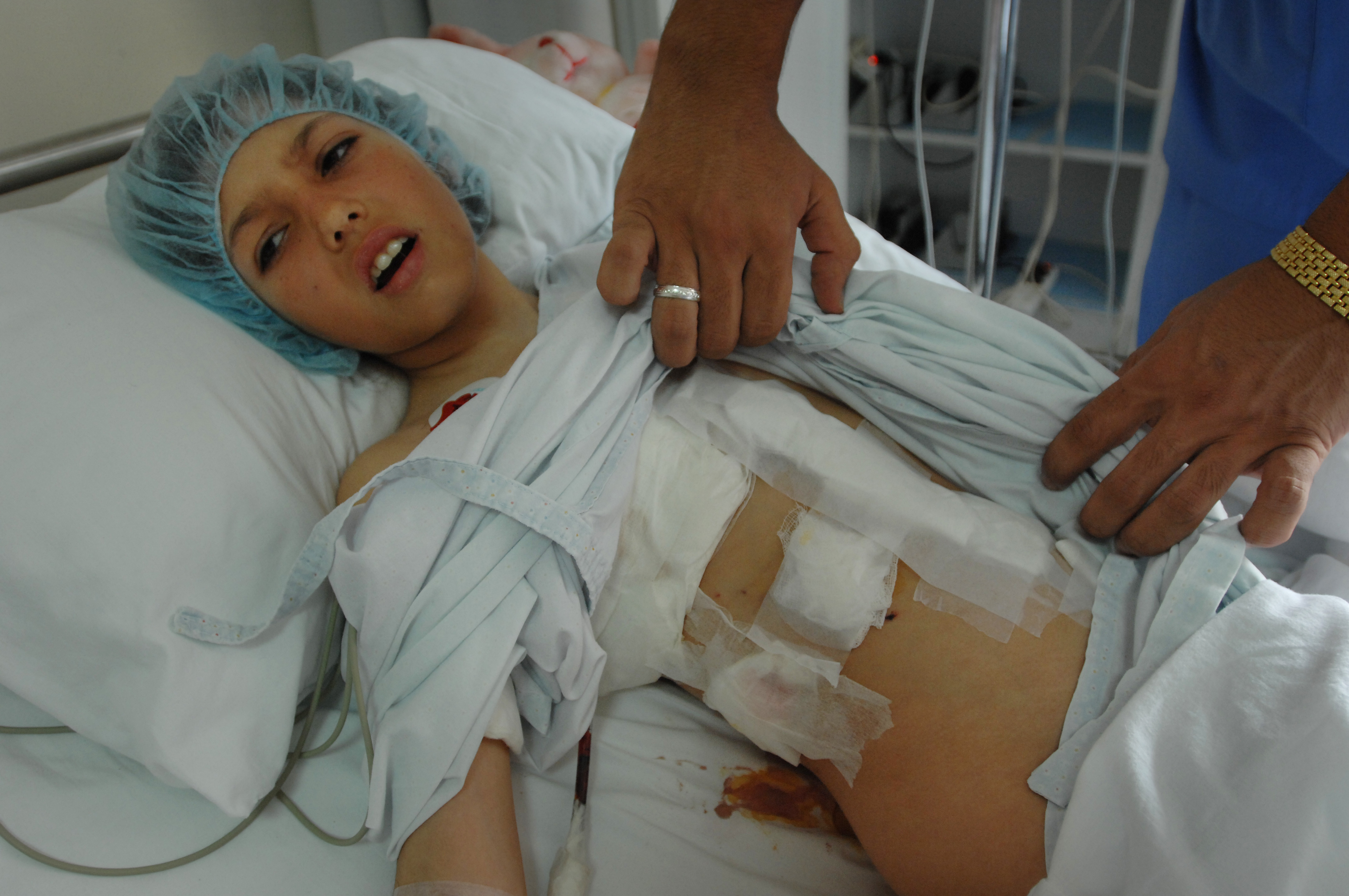
Lebanese girl wounded by a cluster bomblet in 2006

- Extensively used by Israel during the 1978 Israeli invasion of Lebanon, the 1982–2000 occupation of Lebanon and also by Hezbollah in the 2006 Lebanon War.

During the Israeli-Lebanese conflict in 1982, Israel used cluster munitions, many of them American-made, on targets in southern Lebanon. Israel also used 4.6 million cluster bombs in the 2006 Lebanon War.

Two types of cluster munitions were transferred to Israel from the US The first was the CBU-58 which uses the BLU-63 bomblet. This cluster bomb is no longer in production. The second was the MK-20 Rockeye, produced by Honeywell Incorporated in Minneapolis. The CBU-58 was used by Israel in Lebanon in both 1978 and 1982. The Israeli Defense company Israel Military Industries also manufactures the more up-to-date M-85 cluster bomb.

Hezbollah fired Chinese-manufactured cluster munitions against Israeli civilian targets, using 122 mm rocket launchers during the 2006 war, hitting Kiryat Motzkin, Nahariya, Karmiel, Maghar, and Safsufa. A total of 113 rockets and 4,407 submunitions were fired into Israel during the war.

According to the United Nations Mine Action Service, Israel dropped up to four million submunitions on Lebanese soil, of which one million remain unexploded. According to a report prepared by Lionel Beehner for the Council on Foreign Relations, the United States restocked Israel's arsenal of cluster bombs, triggering a State Department investigation to determine whether Israel had violated secret agreements it had signed with the United States on their use.

As Haaretz reported in November 2006, the Israel Defense Forces Chief of Staff Dan Halutz wanted to launch an investigation into the use of cluster bombs during the Lebanon war. Halutz claimed that some cluster bombs had been fired against his direct order, which stated that cluster bombs should be used with extreme caution and not be fired into populated areas. The IDF apparently disobeyed this order.

Human Rights Watch said there was evidence that Israel had used cluster bombs very close to civilian areas and described them as "unacceptably inaccurate and unreliable weapons when used around civilians" and that "they should never be used in populated areas". Human Rights Watch has accused Israel of using cluster munitions in an attack on Bilda, a Lebanese village, on 19 July which killed 1 civilian and injured 12, including 7 children. The Israeli "army defended ... the use of cluster munitions in its offensive with Lebanon, saying that using such munitions was 'legal under international law' and the army employed them 'in accordance with international standards'". Foreign Ministry Spokesman Mark Regev added, "[I]f NATO countries stock these weapons and have used them in recent conflicts – in FR Yugoslavia, Afghanistan and Iraq – the world has no reason to point a finger at Israel."

Remnants of two different types of Israeli cluster munitions were found in 2025 following the 2024 Israeli invasion of Lebanon in three locations south of the Litani River, in the forested valleys of Wadi Zibqin, Wadi Barghouz and Wadi Deir Siryan. The evidence indicates that Israel had used cluster munitions for the first time since the 2006 Lebanon war. Two new types of cluster munitions were found, the 155mm M999 Barak Eitan and 227mm Ra'am Eitan manufactured in 2017 and developed by Elbit Systems (a M270 MLRS round).

=== Twelve-Day War ===
Amnesty international and Israel accused Iran of using cluster munitions when it fired multiple ballistic missiles at Israel from 20 June to 23 June 2025, during the Twelve-Day War. In a report by Amnesty International that provided evidence of the use of cluster munitions in its attacks against Israel, the organization condemned Iran's use of these warheads targeting residential areas as "a flagrant violation of international humanitarian law," with the organization's Erika Guevara Rosas stating that these are "inherently indiscriminate weapons that must never be used" and that the manner in which they were fired at Israel "demonstrated clear disregard for international humanitarian law."

=== 2026 Iran War ===
By the tenth day of the 2026 Iran War, Iran had fired a total of 300 missiles at Israel, of which nearly half had cluster submunitions, which can spread dozens of explosive warheads over a radius of 10 kilometres (6.2 mi).

In the 40 days from the start of the war through the 8 April ceasefire, there were a total of 650 missile attacks from Iran to Israel, the majority of which carried cluster munitions. Of the 24 civilians killed, all of them civilians, 10 were victims of cluster submunitions.

Iran also accused the US and Israel of employing cluster munitions in their attacks in Iran during the war.

== Threat to civilians ==
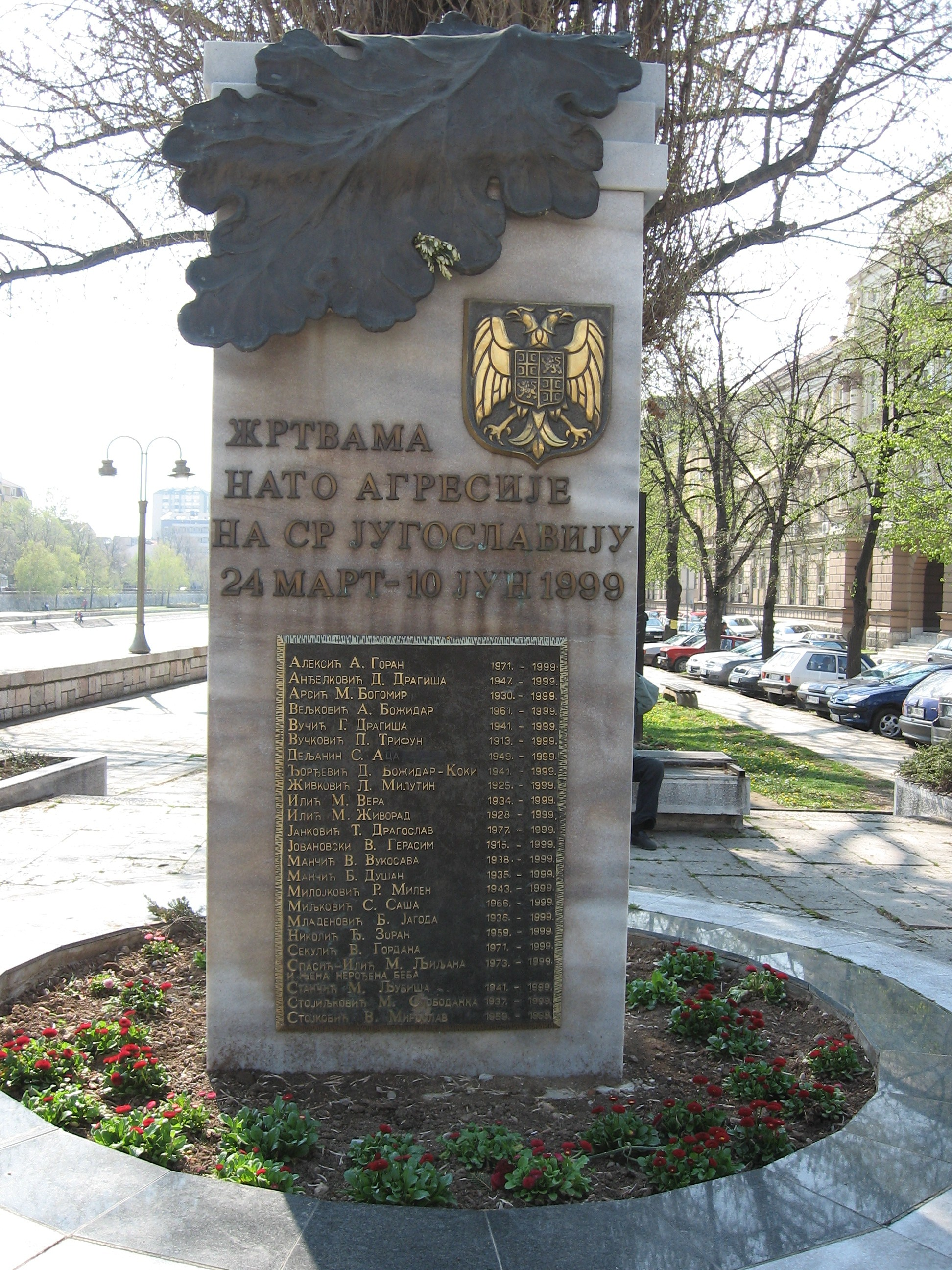
Monument to victims of the Niš cluster bombing

While all weapons are dangerous, cluster bombs pose a particular threat to civilians for two reasons: they have a wide area of effect, and they consistently leave behind a large number of unexploded bomblets. The unexploded bomblets can remain dangerous for decades after the end of a conflict. For example, while the United States cluster bombing of Laos stopped in 1973, cluster bombs and other unexploded munitions continued to cause over 100 casualties per year to Laotian civilians as of 2009.

Cluster munitions are opposed by many individuals and hundreds of groups, such as the Red Cross, the Cluster Munition Coalition and the United Nations, because of the high number of civilians that have fallen victim to the weapon. Since February 2005, Handicap International called for cluster munitions to be prohibited and collected hundreds of thousands of signatures to support its call. 98% of 13,306 recorded cluster munitions casualties that are registered with Handicap International are civilians, while 27% are children.

The area affected by a single cluster munition, known as its footprint, can be very large; a single unguided M26 MLRS rocket can effectively cover an area of 0.23 km^{2} (57 acres). In US and most allied services, the M26 has been replaced by the M30 guided missile fired from the MLRS. The M30 has greater range and accuracy but a smaller area of coverage.

Because of the weapon's broad area of effect, they have often been documented as striking both civilian and military objects in the target area. This characteristic of the weapon is particularly problematic for civilians when cluster munitions are used in or near populated areas, as documented in a research report by Human Rights Watch. In some cases, like the Zagreb rocket attack, civilians were deliberately targeted by such weapons.

The executive director of the Arms Control Association called the Iranian targeting of cluster munition warheads at residential sections of Israel during the 2026 Iran War as deliberate, saying that "Iran appears to be launching them into relatively populated areas, probably with the goal of producing potential civilian harm." Reviewing the pattern of Iranian missile strikes during the war, N.R. Jenzen-Jones of Armament Research Services stated that this type of cluster warhead targeted at Israel had no "clear military purpose" and is being used "primarily to sow terror amongst a civilian population."

=== Unexploded ordnance ===
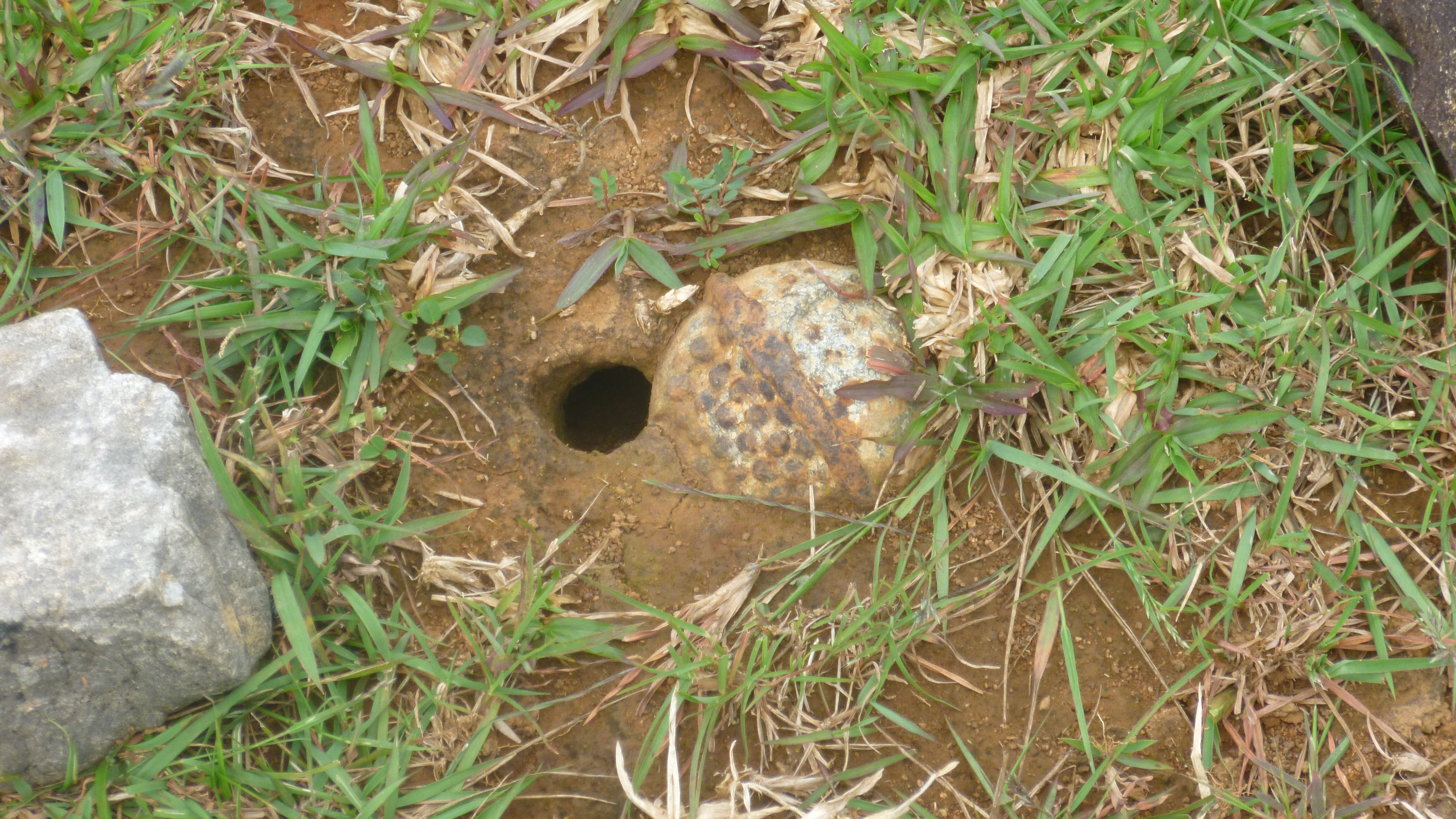
Unexploded cluster sub-munition, probably a BLU-26 type. Plain of Jars, Laos.

The other serious problem, also common to explosive weapons is unexploded ordnance (UXO) of cluster bomblets left behind after a strike. These bomblets may be duds or in some cases the weapons are designed to detonate at a later stage. In both cases, the surviving bomblets are live and can explode when handled, making them a serious threat to civilians and military personnel entering the area. In effect, the UXOs can function like land mines.

Even though cluster bombs are designed to explode prior to or on impact, there are always some individual submunitions that do not explode on impact. As of 2000, the US-made MLRS with M26 warhead and M77 submunitions which were supposed to have a 5% failure rate, but studies have shown that some have a much higher rate. The rate in acceptance tests prior to the Gulf War for this type ranged from 2% to 23% for rockets cooled to −25 °F (−32 °C) before testing. The M483A1 DPICM artillery-delivered cluster bombs have a reported failure rate of 14%. In July 2023, the failure rate of Russian cluster bombs during the 2022 Russian invasion of Ukraine was reported to be at 40 percent or more.

Given that each cluster bomb can contain hundreds of bomblets and be fired in volleys, even a small failure rate can lead each strike to leave behind hundreds or thousands of UXOs scattered across the strike area. For example, after the 2006 Israel-Lebanon conflict, UN experts estimated that as many as one million unexploded bomblets released by Israel may contaminate the hundreds of cluster munition strike sites in Lebanon.

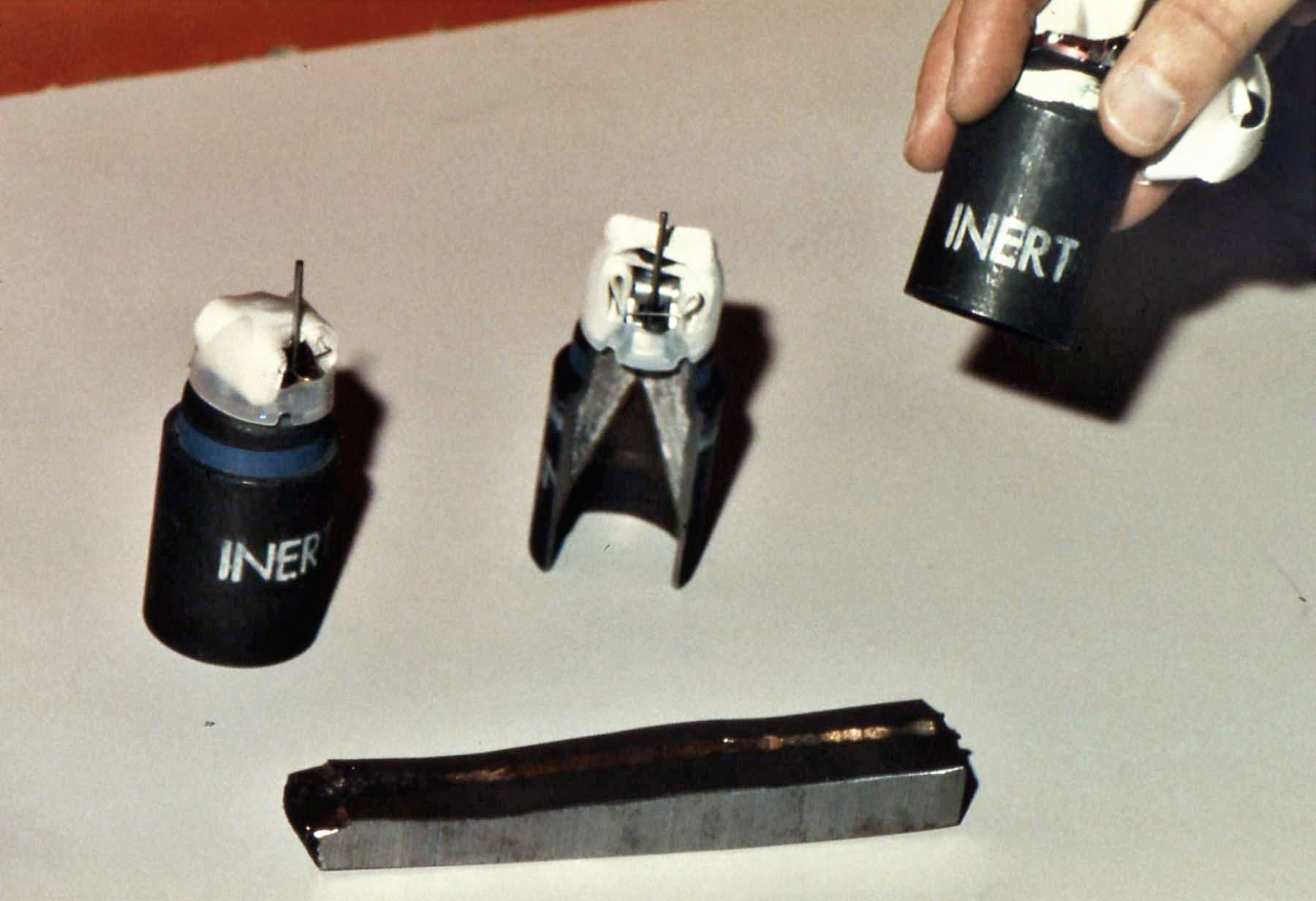
M77 submunition of type fired against Lebanon in 1986. Each MLRS rocket has 644 M77 packed in the warhead.

In addition, some cluster bomblets, such as the BLU-97/B used in the CBU-87, are brightly colored to increase their visibility and warn off civilians. However, the yellow color, coupled with their small and nonthreatening appearance, is attractive to young children who wrongly believe them to be toys. This problem was exacerbated in the War in Afghanistan (2001–2021), when US forces dropped humanitarian rations from airplanes with similar yellow-colored packaging as the BLU-97/B, yellow being the NATO standard colour for high explosive filler in air weapons. The rations packaging was later changed first to blue and then to clear in the hope of avoiding such hazardous confusion.

As of 1993, the US military was developing new cluster bombs that it claimed could have a much lower (less than 1%) failure rate. Sensor-fused weapons containing a limited number of submunitions that are capable of autonomously engaging armored targets may provide a viable if costly alternative to cluster munitions that will allow multiple target engagement with one shell or bomb while avoiding the civilian deaths and injuries consistently documented from the use of cluster munitions.

In the 1980s the Spanish firm Esperanza y Cia developed a 120 mm mortar bomb that contained 21 anti-armor submunitions. The 120mm "Espin" had a unique electrical impact fusing system which eliminated dangerous duds. The system relied on a capacitor in each submunition that was charged by a wind generator in the nose of the projectile after being fired. If the electrical fuse fails to function on impact, approximately five minutes later the capacitor bleeds out, therefore neutralizing the submunition's electronic fuse system.

==== Civilian deaths ====
- As of 2006, people in Vietnam were still being injured or killed as a result of cluster bombs and other objects left by the US and Vietnamese military forces.
- Some 270 million cluster submunitions were dropped on Laos in the 1960s and 1970s; approximately one third of these submunitions failed to explode and continue to pose a threat today.
- Within the first year after the end of the Kosovo War, more than 100 civilians died from unexploded bombs and mines. During the war, NATO planes dropped nearly 1,400 cluster bombs in Kosovo. Cluster bombs make up to 40% of mines and unexploded bombs in Kosovo.
- Israel used cluster bombs in Lebanon in 1978 and in the 1980s. Those weapons used more than two decades ago by Israel continue to affect Lebanon. During the 2006 war in Lebanon, Israel fired large numbers of cluster bombs in Lebanon, containing an estimated more than four million cluster submunitions. In the first month following the ceasefire, unexploded cluster munitions killed or injured an average of 3–4 people per day.
- During the 2026 Iran War, two workers were killed and a third seriously injured in March 2026 in Yehud, outside of Tel Aviv, after being struck by submunitions from an Iranian missile equipped with a cluster bomb warhead. The two had been struck outdoors at a construction site and had not been in a protected shelter; the first victim was killed immediately, while the second victim succumbed the following day. On 17 March, a cluster munition from the warhead of an Iranian missile hit an apartment building in Ramat Gan and killed two residents in their 70s, who were found just outside their safe room.

==== Locations ====
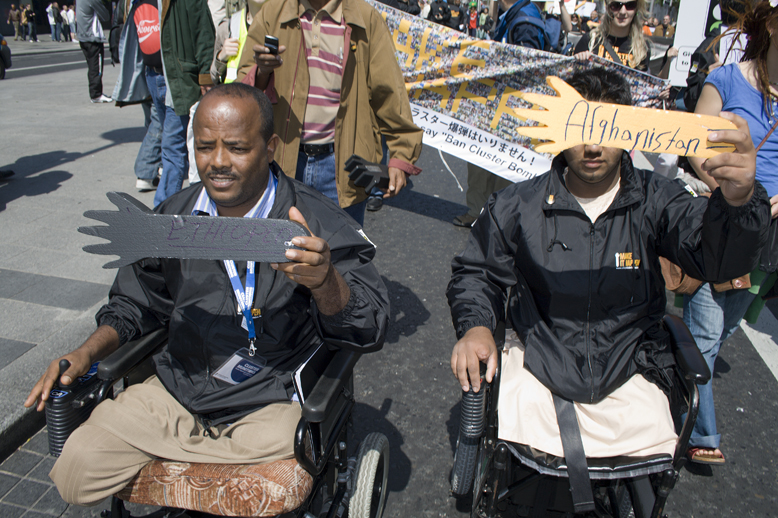
Ban Advocates from Afghanistan and Ethiopia demonstrating outside of the Dublin conference

Countries and disputed territories (listed in italic) that have been affected by cluster munitions as of November 2024 include:

- Afghanistan
- Angola
- Azerbaijan (mainly Nagorno Karabakh)
- Cambodia
- Chad
- Democratic Republic of the Congo
- Donetsk People's Republic
- Eritrea
- Ethiopia
- Germany
- Iran
- Iraq
- Laos
- Lebanon
- Libya
- Luhansk People's Republic
- Malta
- Serbia
- South Sudan
- Sudan
- Syria
- Tajikistan
- Ukraine
- United Kingdom
- Vietnam
- Yemen
- Kosovo
- Western Sahara

As of November 2024, it is unclear whether or not Georgia is contaminated. Albania, Bosnia and Herzegovina, the Republic of the Congo, Croatia, Grenada, Guinea-Bissau, Mauritania, Montenegro, Mozambique, Norway, Zambia, Uganda, and Thailand completed clearance of areas contaminated by cluster munition remnants in previous years.

== International legislation ==
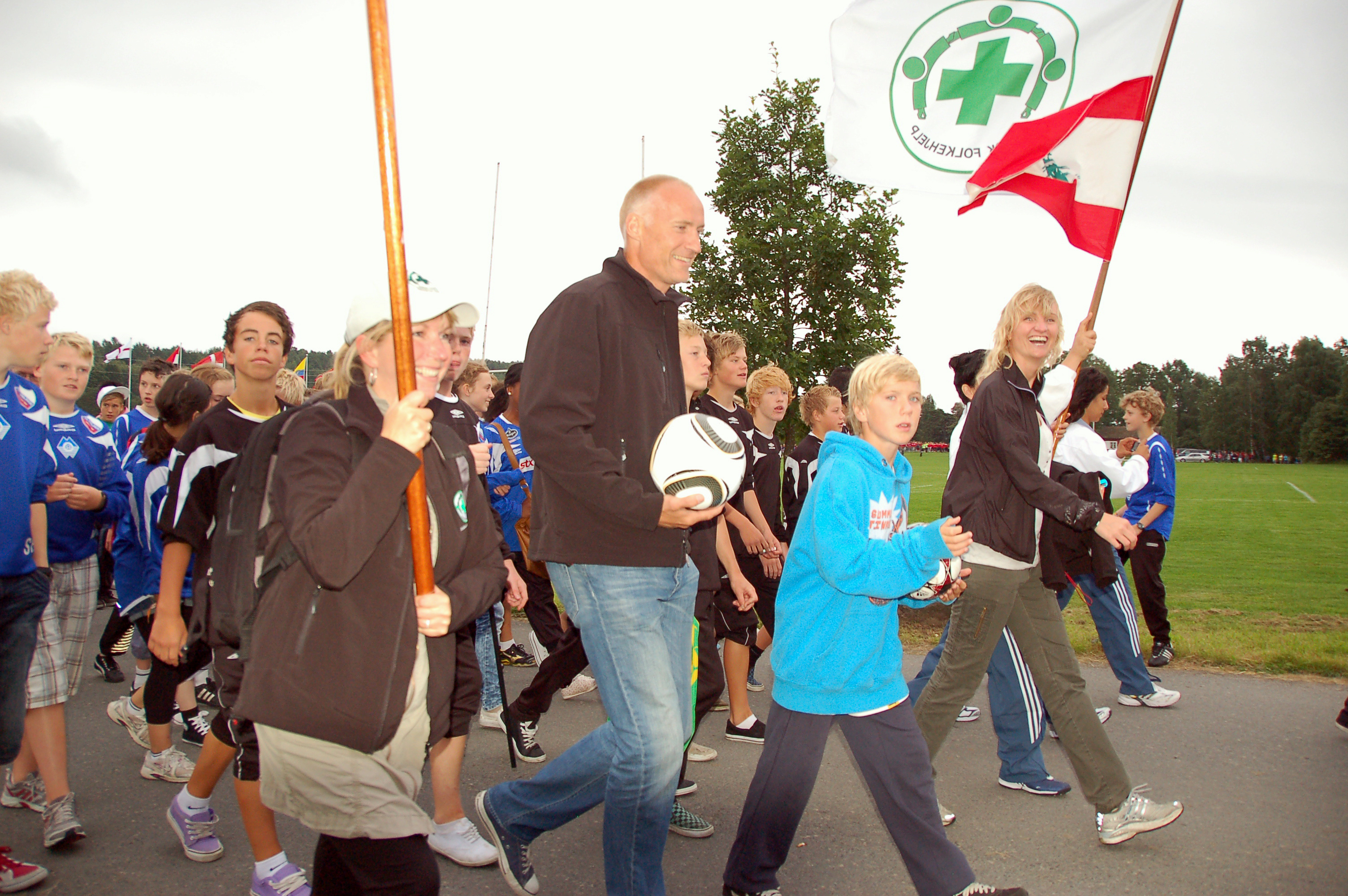
Erik Thorstvedt leads a Norwegian parade celebrating the effectuation of the Convention on Cluster Munitions, 31 July 2010. (Photo: Norsk Folkehjelp)

Cluster bombs fall under the general rules of international humanitarian law, but were not specifically covered by any currently binding international legal instrument until the signature of the Convention on Cluster Munitions in December 2008. This international treaty stemmed from an initiative by Stoltenberg's Second Cabinet known as the Oslo Process which was launched in February 2007 to prohibit cluster munitions. More than 100 countries agreed to the text of the resulting Convention on Cluster Munitions in May 2008 which sets out a comprehensive ban on these weapons. This treaty was signed by 94 states in Oslo on 3–4 December 2008. The Oslo Process was launched largely in response to the failure of the Convention on Certain Conventional Weapons (CCW) where five years of discussions failed to find an adequate response to these weapons. The Cluster Munition Coalition (CMC) is campaigning for the widespread accession to and ratification of the Convention on Cluster Munitions.

A number of sections of the Protocol on explosive remnants of war (Protocol V to the 1980 Convention), 28 November 2003 occasionally address some of the problems associated with the use of cluster munitions, in particular Article 9, which mandates States Parties to "take generic preventive measures aimed at minimising the occurrence of explosive remnants of war". In June 2006, Belgium was the first country to issue a ban on the use (carrying), transportation, export, stockpiling, trade and production of cluster munitions, and Austria followed suit on 7 December 2007.

There has been legislative activity on cluster munitions in several countries, including Austria, Australia, Denmark, France, Germany, Luxembourg, Netherlands, Norway, Sweden, Switzerland, United Kingdom and United States. In some of these countries, ongoing discussions concerning draft legislation banning cluster munitions, along the lines of the legislation adopted in Belgium and Austria will now turn to ratification of the global ban treaty. Norway and Ireland have national legislation prohibiting cluster munitions and were able to deposit their instruments of ratification to the Convention on Cluster Munitions immediately after signing it in Oslo on 3 December 2008.

=== International treaties ===
Nations subscribing to the Wellington Declaration, which led to the Convention on Cluster Munitions

Other weapons, such as land mines, have been banned in many countries under specific legal instruments for several years, notably the Ottawa Treaty to ban land mines, and some of the Protocols in the Convention on Certain Conventional Weapons that also help clearing the lands contaminated by left munitions after the end of conflicts and provides international assistance to the affected populations. However, until the adoption of the Convention on Cluster Munitions in Dublin in May 2008 cluster bombs were not banned by any international treaty and were considered legitimate weapons by some governments.

To increase pressure for governments to come to an international treaty on 13 November 2003, the Cluster Munition Coalition (CMC) was established with the goal of addressing the impact of cluster munitions on civilians.

International governmental deliberations in the Convention on Certain Conventional Weapons turned on the broader problem of explosive remnants of war, a problem to which cluster munitions have contributed in a significant way. There were consistent calls from the Cluster Munition Coalition, the International Committee of the Red Cross (ICRC) and a number of UN agencies, joined by approximately 30 governments, for international governmental negotiations to develop specific measures that would address the humanitarian problems cluster munitions pose. This did not prove possible in the conventional multilateral forum. After a reversal in the US position, in 2007 deliberations did begin on cluster munitions within the Convention on Certain Conventional Weapons. There was a concerted effort led by the US to develop a new protocol to the Convention on Certain Conventional Weapons, but this proposal was rejected by over 50 states, together with civil society, ICRC and UN agencies. The discussions ended with no result in November 2011, leaving the 2008 Convention on Cluster Munitions as the single international standard on the weapons.

In February 2006, Belgium announced its decision to ban the weapon by law. Then Norway announced a national moratorium in June and Austria announced its decision in July to work for an international instrument on the weapon. The international controversy over the use and impact of cluster munitions during the war between Lebanon and Israel in July and August 2006 added weight to the global campaign for a ban treaty.

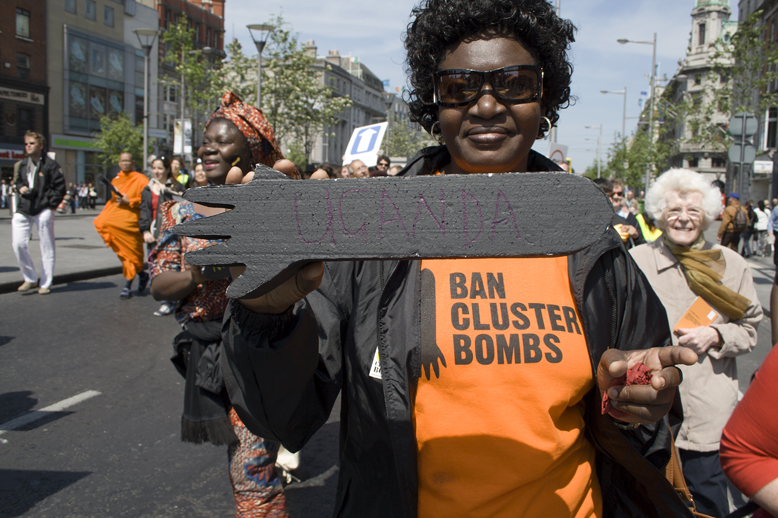
Ugandan demonstrator at the May 2008 Dublin conference for the Convention on Cluster Munitions

A new flexible multilateral process similar to the process that led to the ban on anti-personnel land mines in 1997 (the Ottawa Treaty) began with an announcement in November 2006 in Geneva as well at the same time by the Government of Norway that it would convene an international meeting in early 2007 in Oslo to work towards a new treaty prohibiting cluster munitions. Forty-nine governments attended the meeting in Oslo 22–23 February 2007 in order to reaffirm their commitment to a new international ban on the weapon.

A follow-up meeting in this process was held in Lima in May where around 70 states discussed the outline of a new treaty, Hungary became the latest country to announce a moratorium and Peru launched an initiative to make Latin America a cluster munition free zone.

In addition, the ICRC held an experts meeting on cluster munitions in April 2007 which helped clarify technical, legal, military and humanitarian aspects of the weapon with a view to developing an international response.

Further meetings took place in Vienna on 4–7 December 2007, and in Wellington on 18–22 February 2008 where a declaration in favor of negotiations on a draft convention was adopted by more than 80 countries. In May 2008 after around 120 countries had subscribed to the Wellington Declaration and participated in the Dublin Diplomatic Conference from 19 to 30 May 2008. At the end of this conference, 107 countries agreed to adopt the Convention on Cluster Munitions, that bans cluster munitions and was opened for signature in Oslo on 3–4 December 2008 where it was signed by 94 countries. In July 2008, United States Defense Secretary Robert M. Gates implemented a policy to eliminate by 2018 all cluster bombs that do not meet new safety standards.

In November 2008, ahead of the signing Conference in Oslo, the European Parliament passed a resolution calling on all European Union governments to sign and ratify the Convention.

On 16 February 2010 Burkina Faso became the 30th state to deposit its instrument of ratification for the Convention on Cluster Munitions. This means that the number of States required for the Convention to enter into force had been reached. The treaty's obligations became legally binding on the 30 ratifying States on 1 August 2010 and subsequently for other ratifying States.

=== Convention on Cluster Munitions ===
Taking effect on 1 August 2010, the Convention on Cluster Munitions bans the stockpiling, use and transfer of virtually all existing cluster bombs and provides for the clearing up of unexploded munitions. It had been signed by 108 countries, of which 38 had ratified it by the affected date, but many major military powers including the United States, Russia, India, Brazil and China are not signatories.

The Convention on Cluster Munitions entered into force on 1 August 2010, six months after it was ratified by 30 states. As of 26 September 2018, a total of 120 states had joined the Convention, as 104 States parties and 16 signatories.

For an updated list of countries, see Convention on Cluster Munitions#State parties

=== United States policy ===
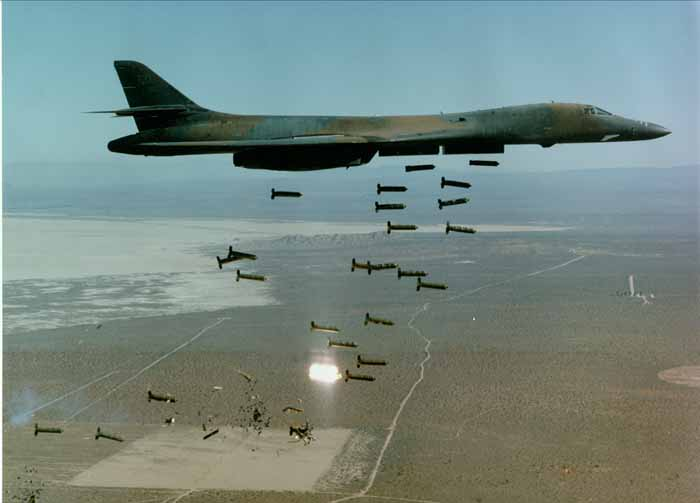
USAF B-1 Lancer dropping CBU cluster bombs

According to the US State Department, the US suspended operational use of cluster munitions in 2003, however, Amnesty International published a report that the US used them in Yemen during the 2009 al-Majalah camp attack.

US arguments favoring the use of cluster munitions are that their use reduces the number of aircraft and artillery systems needed to support military operations and if they were eliminated, significantly more money would have to be spent on new weapons, ammunition, and logistical resources. Also, militaries would need to increase their use of massed artillery and rocket barrages to get the same coverage, which would destroy or damage more key infrastructures.

The US was initially against any CCW limitation negotiations, but dropped its opposition in June 2007. Cluster munitions have been determined as needed for ensuring the country's national security interests, but measures were taken to address humanitarian concerns of their use, as well as pursuing their original suggested alternative to a total ban of pursuing technological fixes to make the weapons no longer viable after the end of a conflict.

In May 2008, then-Acting Assistant Secretary of State for Political-Military Affairs Stephen Mull stated that the US military relies upon cluster munitions as an important part of their war strategy. Mull emphasized that "US forces simply cannot fight by design or by doctrine without holding out at least the possibility of using cluster munitions."

The US Army ceased procurement of GMLRS cluster rockets in December 2008 because of a submunition dud rate as high as five percent. Pentagon policy was to have all cluster munitions used after 2018 to have a submunition unexploded ordnance rate of less than one percent. To achieve this, the Army undertook the Alternative Warhead Program (AWP) to assess and recommend technologies to reduce or eliminate cluster munition failures, as some 80 percent of US military cluster weapons reside in Army artillery stockpiles. In July 2012, the US fired at a target area with 36 Guided Multiple Launch Rocket System (GMLRS) unitary warhead rockets. Analysis indicated that capability gaps existed as cluster munitions require approval by the Combatant Commander which reduced the advantage of responsive precision fire. The same effect could have been made by four Alternative Warhead (AW) GMLRS rockets under development by the AWP to engage the same target set as cluster munitions. Without access to the AW, the operation required using nine times as many rockets, cost nine times as much ($3.6 million compared to $400,000), and took 40 times as long (more than 20 minutes compared to less than 30 seconds) to execute.

Starting with the Omnibus Appropriations Act, 2009 (P.L. 111-8) annual Consolidated Appropriations Act legislation has placed export moratorium language on cluster weapons since then. On 19 May 2011 the Defense Security Cooperation Agency issued a memorandum prohibiting the sale of all but the CBU-97B CBU-105 Sensor Fuzed Weapon because the others have been demonstrated to have a unexploded ordnance rate of greater than 1%.

On 30 November 2017, the Pentagon put off indefinitely their planned ban on using cluster bombs after 2018, as they had been unable to produce submunitions with failure rates of 1% or less. Since it is unclear how long it might take to achieve that standard, a months-long policy review concluded the deadline should be postponed; deployment of existing cluster weapons is left to commanders' discretion to authorize their use when deemed necessary "until sufficient quantities" of safer versions are developed and fielded.

== Users ==
=== Countries ===
At least 25 countries have used cluster munitions in recent history (since the creation of the United Nations). Countries listed in bold have signed and ratified the Convention on Cluster Munitions, agreeing in principle to ban cluster bombs. Countries listed in italic have signed, but not yet ratified the Convention on Cluster Munitions.

- Armenia
- Azerbaijan
- Bahrain
- **Colombia**
- Egypt
- **(Ethiopia)** /Ethiopia
- Eritrea
- **France**
- Georgia
- Iran
- **(Ba'athist Iraq) /Iraq**
- Israel
- (History of Libya under Muammar Gaddafi) /Libya
- Morocco
- **Netherlands**
- **Nigeria** (responsibility denied)
- Russia
- Saudi Arabia
- **/South Africa**
- **Sri Lanka** (responsibility denied)
- Sudan
- Syria
- Thailand
- United States
- Ukraine

In addition, at least three countries that no longer exist (the Soviet Union, Yugoslavia and the Democratic Republic of Afghanistan) used cluster bombs. In some cases, the responsibility or even the use of cluster munition is denied by the local government.

=== Non-state armed groups ===
Very few violent non-state actors have used cluster munitions and their delivery systems due to the complexity. As of August 2019, cluster munitions have been used in conflicts by non-state actors in at least six countries.

- Croatian militia
- Hezbollah
- Islamic State of Iraq and the Levant
- Northern Alliance
- / Serbian militia
- Separatist forces of the war in Donbas

== Producers ==
At least 31 nations have produced cluster munitions in recent history (since the creation of the United Nations). Many of these nations still have stocks of these munitions. Most (but not all) of them are involved in recent wars or long unsolved international conflicts; however most of them did not use the munitions they produced. Countries listed in bold have signed and ratified the Convention on Cluster Munitions, agreeing in principle to ban cluster bombs. As of February 2024, countries marked with an Asterisk (*) officially ceased production of cluster munitions; countries marked with two asterisks (**) unofficially ceased production of cluster munitions.

- **Belgium***
- **Bosnia and Herzegovina***
- Brazil
- **Chile***
- China
- **Croatia***
- Egypt
- **France***
- **Germany***
- Greece**
- India
- Iran
- **(Ba'athist Iraq) /Iraq***
- Israel**
- **Japan***
- **Netherlands***
- North Korea
- South Korea
- Pakistan
- Poland
- Romania**
- Russia
- Singapore**
- **Slovakia***
- **South Africa***
- **Spain***
- **Sweden***
- Taiwan
- Turkey*
- **United Kingdom***
- United States**

== Countries with stocks ==
As of June 2025, at least 47 countries have stockpiles of cluster munitions. Countries listed in bold have signed and ratified the Convention on Cluster Munitions, agreeing in principle that their stockpiles should be destroyed. Countries listed in italic have signed, but not yet ratified the Convention on Cluster Munitions; countries marked with an Asterisk (*) are in the process of destroying their stockpiles.

- Algeria
- Azerbaijan
- Bahrain
- Belarus
- Brazil
- Cambodia
- China
- Cyprus
- Egypt
- Eritrea
- Estonia
- Ethiopia
- Finland
- Georgia
- Greece
- India
- Indonesia
- Iran
- Israel
- Jordan
- Kazakhstan
- North Korea
- South Korea
- Kuwait
- Libya
- Morocco
- Oman
- Pakistan
- Poland
- Qatar
- Romania
- Russia
- Saudi Arabia
- Serbia
- Singapore
- Sudan
- Syria
- Taiwan
- Thailand
- Turkey
- Turkmenistan
- United Arab Emirates
- United States
- Uzbekistan
- Venezuela
- Yemen
- Zimbabwe

== Financiers ==
According to BankTrack, an international network of non-governmental organizations specializing in control of financial institutions, many major banks and other financial corporations either directly financed, or provided financial services to companies producing cluster munition in 2005–2012. Among other, BankTrack 2012 report names ABN AMRO, Bank of America, Bank of China, Barclays, BBVA, BNP Paribas, Citigroup, Commerzbank, Commonwealth Bank, Crédit Agricole, Credit Suisse, Deutsche Bank, Goldman Sachs, HSBC, Industrial Bank of China, ING Group, JPMorgan Chase, Korea Development Bank, Lloyds Bank, Merrill Lynch, Morgan Stanley, MUFG Bank, Royal Bank of Canada, Royal Bank of Scotland, Sberbank, Société Générale, UBS and Wells Fargo.

Many of these financial companies are connected to such producers of cluster munitions as Alliant Techsystems, China Aerospace Science and Technology Corporation, Hanwha, Norinco, Singapore Technologies Engineering, Textron, and others.

According to Pax Christi, a Netherlands-based NGO, in 2009, around 137 financial institutions financed cluster munition production. Out of 137 institutions, 63 were based in the US, another 18 in the EU (the United Kingdom, France, Germany, Italy etc.), 16 were based in China, 4 in Singapore, 3 in each of: Canada, Japan, Taiwan, 2 in Switzerland, and 4 other countries had 1 financial institution involved.

== See also ==
- Anti-runway penetration bomb
- Ban Advocates
- Bomb disposal
- Canister shot
- Cluster Munition Coalition
- Demining
- Fares Scale of Injuries due to Cluster Munitions
- List of cluster bombs
- Mines Advisory Group
- Multiple independently targetable reentry vehicle
