= RBK =

RBK may refer to:

- NYSE ticker symbol for Reebok sportswear company
- Robert Bosch Krankenhaus, a charitable hospital in Stuttgart, Germany
- Rockbank railway station, Melbourne
- Rosenborg BK (Rosenborg Ballklub), a Norwegian football club
- RBK-250, a Soviet-era cluster bomb
- RBK-500, a Soviet-era cluster bomb
- RBK Group, a Russian media group
  - RBK TV, owned by the group
  - RBK Daily, a newspaper published by the group
- IATA airport code for French Valley Airport
- Rebecca Bauer-Kahan, a politician in California
