= Molotov bread basket =

Soviet cluster bomb circa 1939–1940

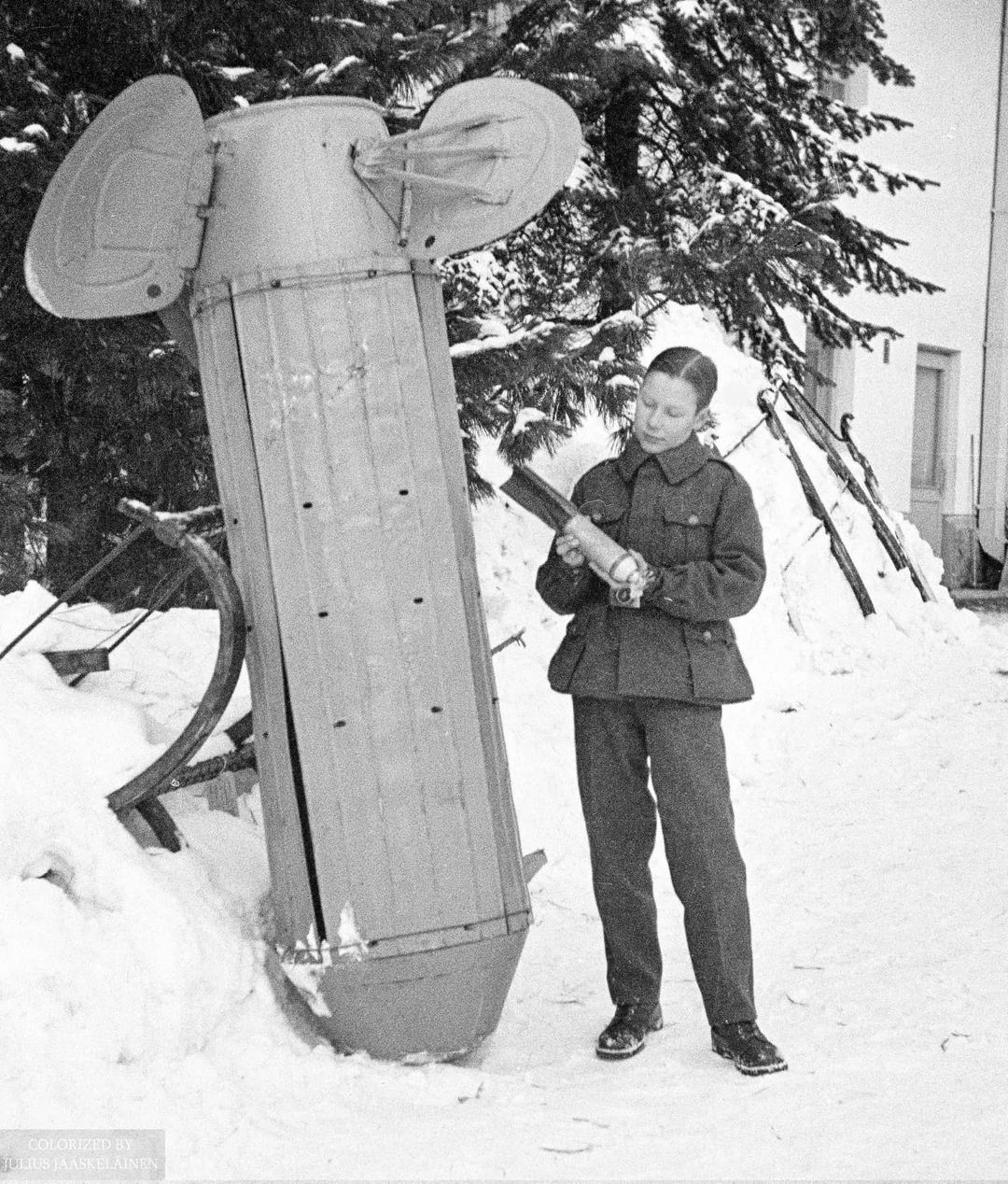
A Soviet RRAB-3 "Molotov bread basket" from which bombs were spread.

The RRAB-3 (Russian: ротативно-рассеивающая авиационная бомба, "rotationally dispersing aviation bomb"), nicknamed the Molotov bread basket (Finnish: Molotovin leipäkori), was a Soviet-made droppable bomb dispenser that combined a large high-explosive charge with a cluster of incendiary bombs. It was used against the cities of Finland during the Winter War of 1939–1940. The bomb consisted of a cylinder 2.25 metres (7.4 ft) long and 0.9 metres (3.0 ft) in diameter.

Described by journalist John Langdon-Davies in 1940:

As it fell from an aircraft, a small turbine on the nose turned to release a spring-loaded casing which, on opening, scattered 100 or more incendiary bombs; the main HE charge in the tail of the weapon continued to fall as a conventional bomb.

Other descriptions make no mention of a main charge and instead describe a large cylinder with vanes at the back that open out when the weapon is dropped. The vanes cause the bomb to spin and this has the effect of opening the sides and scattering the submunitions by centrifugal force.

The name came from the propaganda Vyacheslav Molotov produced during the Winter War, mainly his declaration on Soviet state radio that incendiary bombing missions over Finland were actually "airborne humanitarian food deliveries" for their "starving" neighbours. As a result, the Finns sarcastically dubbed the RRAB-3 incendiary cluster munitions "Molotov bread baskets" (Finnish: Molotovin leipäkori) in reference to Molotov's propaganda broadcasts. This also led to the improvised incendiary devices used by the Finns against Soviet tanks to be nicknamed Molotov cocktails, as "a drink to go with his food parcels".

This description seems to have become common currency among the British public in 1940. During the Bristol Blitz, the locals dubbed a similar German device "Goering's bread basket". The Japanese nickname for such devices was "Molotov flower basket" (Japanese: Molotoffano hanakago); some survivors of the atomic bombing of Hiroshima thought they had been hit by one.

The Soviets had several versions: RRAB-1, RRAB-2 and RRAB-3, with capacities of 1,000, 500 or 250 kilograms (2,200, 1,100 or 550 lb) respectively, each capable of holding various types of submunitions including high explosive, incendiary, and chemical.

The bomb consisted of a cylinder that was 2.25 metres (7 ft 5 in) long and 0.9 metres (2 ft 11 in) in diameter.

== See also ==
- Cluster bomb
- Bombing of Helsinki in World War II
