= Oslo Conference on the humanitarian impact of nuclear weapons =

Multilateral conference on the impact of nuclear weapons

Oslo Conference
- Date: March 4–5, 2013
- Location: Oslo, Norway
- Type: Multilateral disarmament conference
- Theme: Humanitarian impact of nuclear weapons
- Organised by: Government of Norway
- Participants: 127 states

The 2013 Oslo Conference on the humanitarian impact of nuclear weapons was an international diplomatic event held on 4-5 March 2013 in Oslo, Norway. It was the first multilateral meeting dedicated solely to the humanitarian consequences of nuclear weapons use, rather than traditional security or deterrence frameworks. The conference was hosted by the Government of Norway, and was attended by 128 states, several United Nations agencies, the International Red Cross and Red Crescent Movement, and civil society organizations such as the International Campaign to Abolish Nuclear Weapons.

== Background ==
Before the conference, nuclear disarmament discussions were mostly conducted under arms control and non-proliferation frameworks. In the 2010 NPT Review Conference, states formally expressed their "deep concern at the catastrophic humanitarian consequences of any use of nuclear weapons". Growing frustration at the slow pace of disarmament made non-nuclear-weapon states and civil society to adopt a humanitarian approach.

== Objectives ==
The main objectives of the conference were:

- To present evidence on the immediate and long-term humanitarian consequences of a nuclear weapon detonation.
- To assess the capacity of international organizations and states to respond to such a detonation.
- To promote dialogue among states, international organizations and civil society regarding prevention, preparedness, and disarmament.

A paper from United Nations Institute for Disarmament Research notes that the Oslo conference "was centred on expert presentations about the various humanitarian impacts stemming from detonation of nuclear weapons and not disarmament themes".

== Participation ==
The conference was attended by 127 states. None of the recognized nuclear-armed states (China, France, Russia, the UK, the US) participated.

== Outcome ==
The conference concluded with a Chair's Summary issued by Norway's Foreign Ministry, which stated that no state or international body can adequately respond to the humanitarian effects of a nuclear weapon detonation. While no treaty was negotiated at the event, it contributed to the discussions on the Humanitarian Initiative, leading to follow-up humanitarian conferences in Mexico and Austria.

== See also ==
- Nayarit Conference
