= 9N24 =

Russian cluster bomb sub-munition

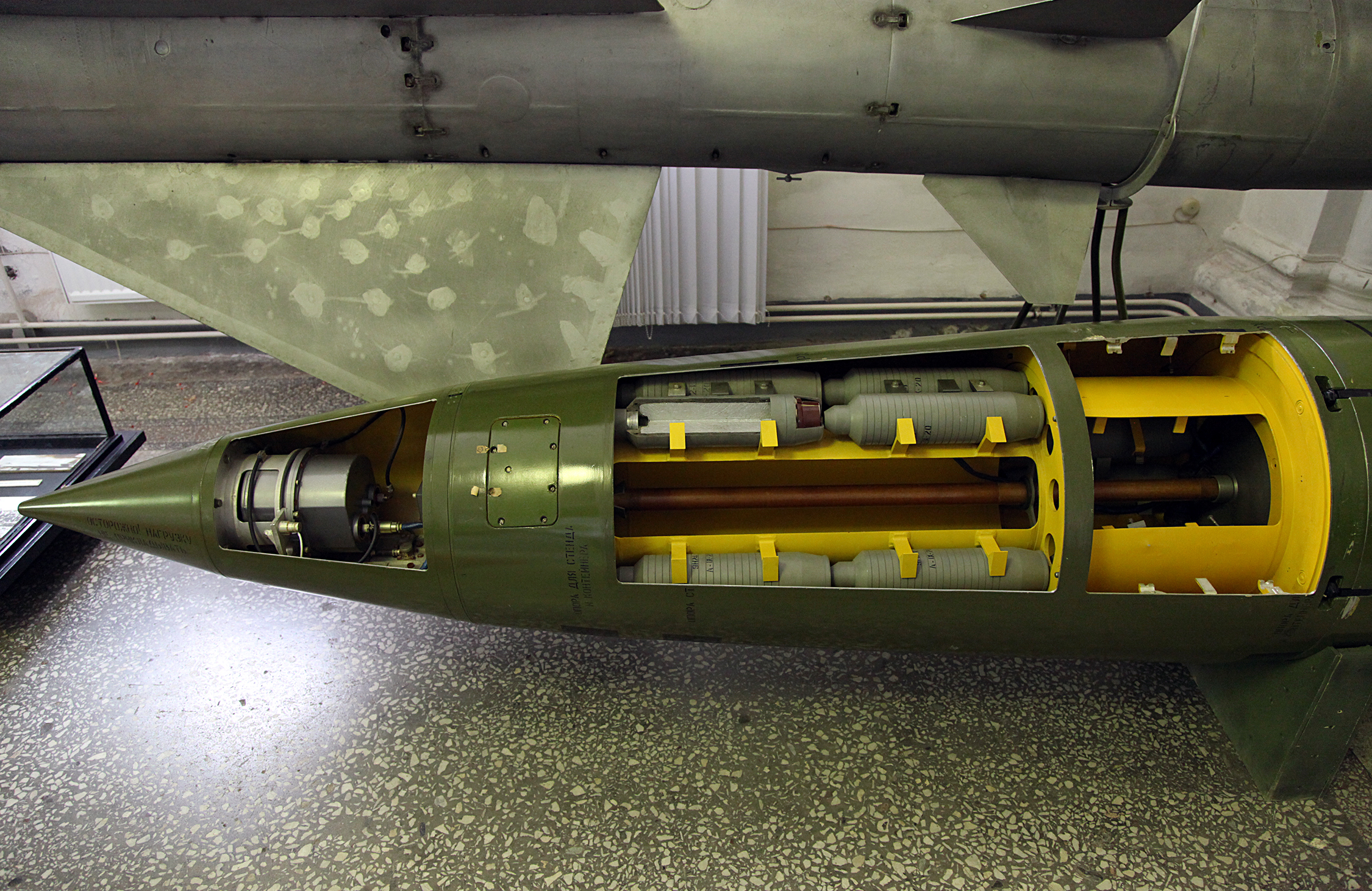
Soviet 9N123K cluster warhead scatters 50 9N24 sub-munitions; often used with the OTR-21 Tochka ballistic missile

The 9N24 (Russian: 9Н24) sub-munition is of Soviet-era design and is used most often with the OTR-21 Tochka tactical ballistic missile (NATO reporting name SS-21 Scarab).

== Technology ==
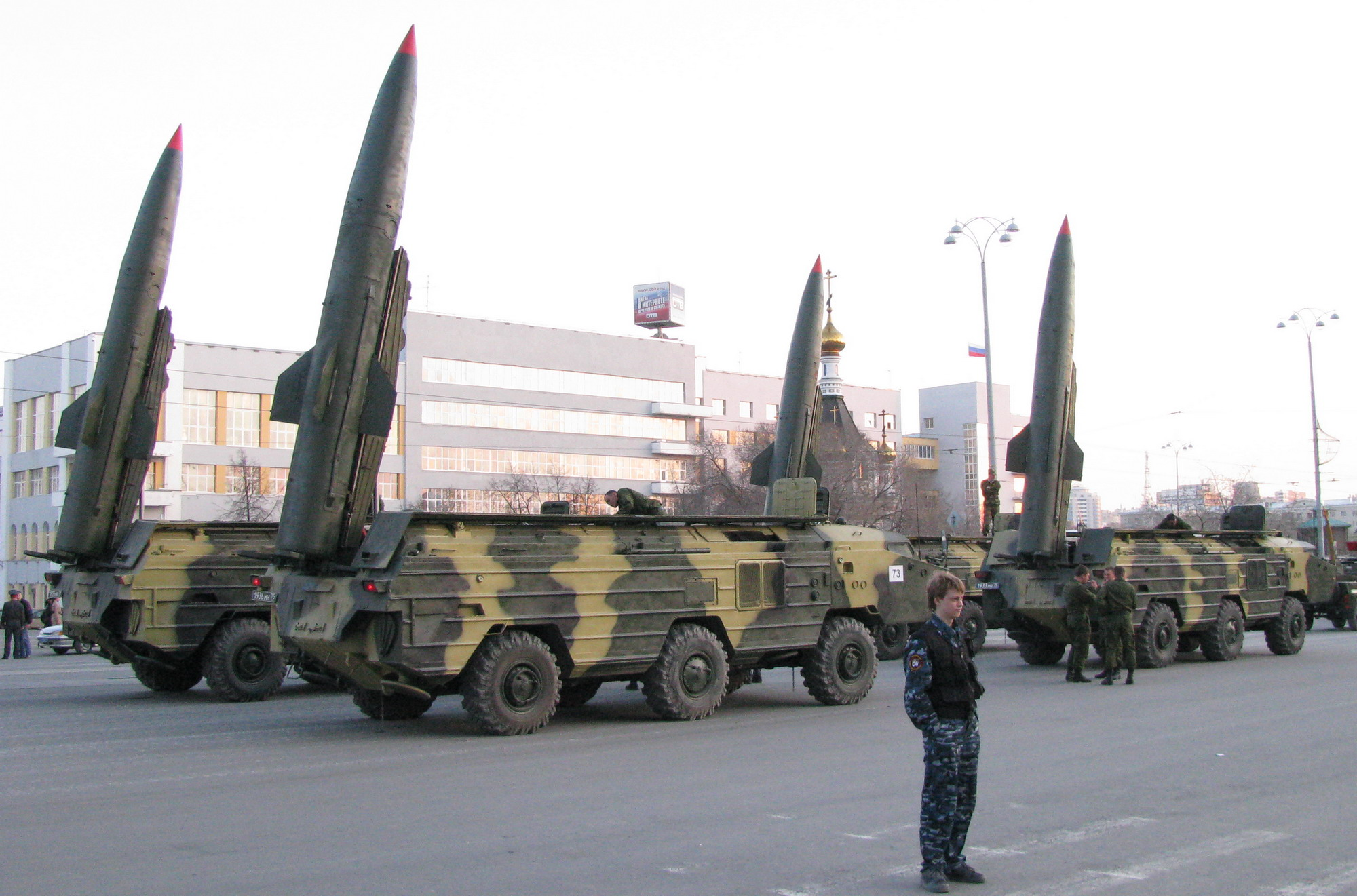
The OTR-21 Tochka vehicle launches solid-fueled ballistic missiles, armed with 9N123K warheads, inside of which are 50 9N24 sub-munitions

The body of 9N24 consists of 18 fragmentation rings with an explosive fill of А-IX-20 mixture, which is constituted by four parts phlegmatized RDX to one part aluminium powder.

The 9N24 uses a ribbon stabilizer.

50 of the 9N24 sub-munitions are arrayed inside a 9N123K warhead.
