= Oslo Conference on Cluster Munitions =

Multilateral conference on the ban of cluster munitions

The Oslo Conference on Cluster Munitions was held in Oslo on 22/23 February 2007 to discuss measures to ban cluster munitions. The Oslo Conference, which was attended by representatives from 49 countries as well as four United Nations organisations and numerous non-governmental organisations, was initiated by Norway. The negotiations continued from 23 to 25 May 2007 in Lima, Peru.

== Background ==
Previous attempts to ban cluster munitions within the framework of the 1981 Convention on the Prohibition or Restriction of the Use of Certain Conventional Weapons (CCW) have always failed due to the blockade policy of the USA and Russia. The conference was a deliberate attempt by Norway to achieve a ban on cluster munitions outside the CCW, which is based on consensus decisions.

== Results of the conference in Oslo ==
46 of the 49 participating states agreed to a ban on 'the use, production, supply and stockpiling of cluster munitions', which is to come into force in 2008. The non-signatories Japan, Poland and Romania argued in favour of a solution within the framework of the 1981 Convention on Certain Conventional Weapons.

== Results of the conference in Lima ==
In Lima, a further 28 states, including Germany, agreed to join an agreement to ban cluster munitions. Among them were the countries affected by cluster munitions Albania, Cambodia, Chad, Guinea-Bissau, Laos, the former user state Nigeria, the producer of cluster munitions Greece as well as Thailand, Saudi Arabia and Yemen as countries with stocks of cluster munitions.
