= RBK-250 =

Russian cluster bomb

RBK-250 is a Soviet 250 kg cluster bomb. Bomb dimensions are 2.3 m length by 0.4 m across, holding multiple bomblets. Each bomblet is 33 cm long, weights 2.8 kg and carries 500 g of explosives.
