= Mokhratagh =

Mokhratagh / Kichik Garabey Մոխրաթաղ / Kiçik Qarabəy
- Location within Azerbaijan
- Coordinates: 40°12′50″N 46°45′11″E
- Country: Azerbaijan
  - District: Aghdara
- Elevation: 760 m (2,490 ft)

Population (2015)
  - Total: 341
- Time zone: UTC+4 (AZT)

Mokhratagh (Armenian: Մոխրաթաղ) or Kichik Garabey (Azerbaijani: Kiçik Qarabəy) is a village located in the Aghdara District of Azerbaijan, in the disputed region of Nagorno-Karabakh. Until 2023 it was controlled by the breakaway Republic of Artsakh. The village had an ethnic Armenian-majority population until the expulsion of the Armenian population of Nagorno-Karabakh by Azerbaijan following the 2023 Azerbaijani offensive in Nagorno-Karabakh.

== History ==
During the Soviet period, the village was part of the Mardakert District of the Nagorno-Karabakh Autonomous Oblast.

== Historical heritage sites ==
Historical heritage sites in and around the village include the 12th-century church of Iny Masants (Armenian: Ինը Մասանց), rebuilt in 1881, a medieval cemetery, and the church of Surb Astvatsatsin (Armenian: Սուրբ Աստվածածին, lit. 'Holy Mother of God') built in 1883.

== Economy and culture ==
The population is mainly engaged in agriculture and animal husbandry. As of 2015, the village has a municipal building, a house of culture, a secondary school, three shops, and a medical centre.

== Demographics ==
The village had 345 inhabitants in 2005, and 341 inhabitants in 2015.
