= Humanitarian impact of nuclear weapons =

Consequences of nuclear explosions

The humanitarian impact of nuclear weapons refers to the catastrophic immediate and long-term consequences of nuclear explosions on human life, public health, natural environment, socioeconomic systems, and future generations. Unlike conventional arms, nuclear weapons inflict indiscriminate harm, causing mass casualties, long-lasting radiation effects, and irreversible damage to ecosystems. The subject has become important in international disarmament discussions, leading to global campaigns and treaties that emphasize the humanitarian imperative to prohibit and eliminate nuclear weapons.

== Background ==
Nuclear explosions generate an intense blast wave, extreme heat, ionizing radiation, and electromagnetic pulses. These factors cause instant fatalities, infrastructure collapse, prolonged suffering, and environmental contamination. The effects transcend borders, which makes nuclear weapons a matter of global human survival.

Following diplomatic efforts by the United Nations, the International Committee of the Red Cross (ICRC), and civil society organizations such as the International Campaign to Abolish Nuclear Weapons (ICAN), the humanitarian approach to nuclear weapons has become a central focus in disarmament discourse.

== Immediate humanitarian consequences ==
A Nevada-series of nuclear weapons effects tests by the United States, displaying initial thermal flash-burns followed by blast and shock-front against various types of vehicles and infrastructures.

Resolution adopted by the General Assembly at its seventy-ninth session concerning the humanitarian consequences of nuclear weapons.

=== Blast and thermal radiation ===
A single nuclear detonation releases an immense amount of energy equivalent to thousands or even millions of tons of TNT. Temperatures at the hypocenter can reach several million degrees Celsius, incinerating everything within its radius. Thermal radiation causes severe burns, temporary or permanent blindness, and widespread fires across entire cities.

=== Casualties ===
The immediate death toll from a nuclear detonation is estimated to reach into hundreds of thousands. Those who survive the initial blast often suffer from traumatic injuries, extensive burns, and radiation sickness, especially in those areas where medical infrastructure has been destroyed or rendered non-functional.

=== Medical infrastructure collapse ===
Hospitals, clinics, and emergency response systems located near the target area are obliterated by the explosion, leaving survivors without access to critical care. According to the World Health Organization, even the combined international humanitarian response capabilities would be insufficient to manage the scale of devastation caused by a nuclear detonation.

== Long term consequences ==
=== Radiation exposure ===
Exposure to ionizing radiation following a nuclear explosion leads to acute radiation syndrome, cancer, cataracts, immune system disorders, and organ failure. Radiation also causes genetic mutations that can be passed on to future generations, resulting in increased rates of birth defects and hereditary diseases.

=== Psychological trauma ===
Survivors of nuclear detonations, especially the Hibakusha in Japan, experience long-term psychological trauma, which includes post-traumatic stress disorder, anxiety, depression, and in many cases, social stigma and discrimination associated with radiation exposure.

== Environmental consequences ==
=== Nuclear fallout ===
Radioactive particles released into the atmosphere after a nuclear explosion contaminate the air, soil, and water over large geographic areas. This fallout severely damages agriculture, threatens food security, and makes water sources unsafe for consumption.

=== Climate effects ===
Scientific studies have shown that multiple nuclear detonations could inject large amounts of soot into the upper atmosphere, blocking sunlight and causing a sharp decrease in global temperatures.This climatic disruption would severely affect agricultural, potentially triggering mass famine on a global scale.

== Socioeconomic impacts ==
Regions affected by nuclear detonations often become uninhabitable for generations due to persistent radiation and environmental contamination. The economic consequences include the destruction of infrastructure, large-scale population displacement, and long-term healthcare problems. Developing countries are disproportionately impacted by these humanitarian consequences because they lack the capacity to respond effectively to such disasters.

== Disarmament diplomacy ==
=== Advisory Opinion on the Legality of the Threat or Use of Nuclear Weapons ===
Legality of the Threat or Use of Nuclear Weapons [1996] ICJ 3 is a landmark international law case, where the International Court of Justice gave an advisory opinion stating that while the threat or use of nuclear weapons would generally be contrary to international humanitarian law, it cannot be concluded whether or not such a threat or use of nuclear weapons would be lawful in extreme circumstances where the very survival of a state would be at stake. The Court held that there is no source of international law that explicitly authorises or prohibits the threat or use of nuclear weapons but such threat or use must be in conformity with the UN Charter and principles of international humanitarian law. The Court also concluded that there was a general obligation to pursue nuclear disarmament.

=== Oslo, Nayarit and Vienna Conferences ===
Between 2013 and 2014, a series of three international conferences were convened to examine the humanitarian impact of nuclear weapons. These gatherings, held in Oslo, Nayarit, and Vienna, contributed to reframing nuclear policy and highlighted the humanitarian aspect of nuclear weapon use.

==== Oslo ====
Held in Oslo, Norway, this inaugural conference highlighted the catastrophic humanitarian consequences of nuclear weapons. It emphasized the inadequacy of international humanitarian response capabilities in the event of a nuclear detonation. The conference was attended by representatives from 127 states, several UN agencies, and numerous non-governmental organizations.

==== Nayarit ====
Hosted in Nuevo Vallarta, Nayarit, Mexico, this conference continued the discussions from Oslo, focusing on the global and long-term consequences of nuclear weapons. Delegations from 146 states, along with representatives from the UN, the ICRC, and civil society organizations, participated in the event. The conference concluded with a call for the development of new international standards on nuclear weapons, including a legally binding instrument to prohibit their use.

==== Vienna ====
The third conference in this series was convened in Vienna, Austria, with 158 states participating. Organized by the Austrian government, the conference aimed to strengthen the global nuclear disarmament and non-proliferation regime by contributing to the growing momentum to firmly anchor the humanitarian aspect in all global efforts dealing with nuclear weapons and nuclear disarmament. The discussions highlighted the need for a comprehensive approach to nuclear disarmament that prioritizes humanitarian considerations.

=== Treaty on the Prohibition of Nuclear Weapons ===
Adopted in 2017, the TPNW is the first legally binding international agreement to comprehensively prohibit nuclear weapons based on humanitarian grounds. The treaty promotes disarmament by taking into account the humanitarian consequences of nuclear weapons rather than solely strategic or technical concerns.

== See also ==
- Humanitarian Initiative
- Comprehensive Nuclear-Test-Ban Treaty Organization
