= Sukhoi Su-34 =

Russian fighter-bomber aircraft

Su-34 / Su-32
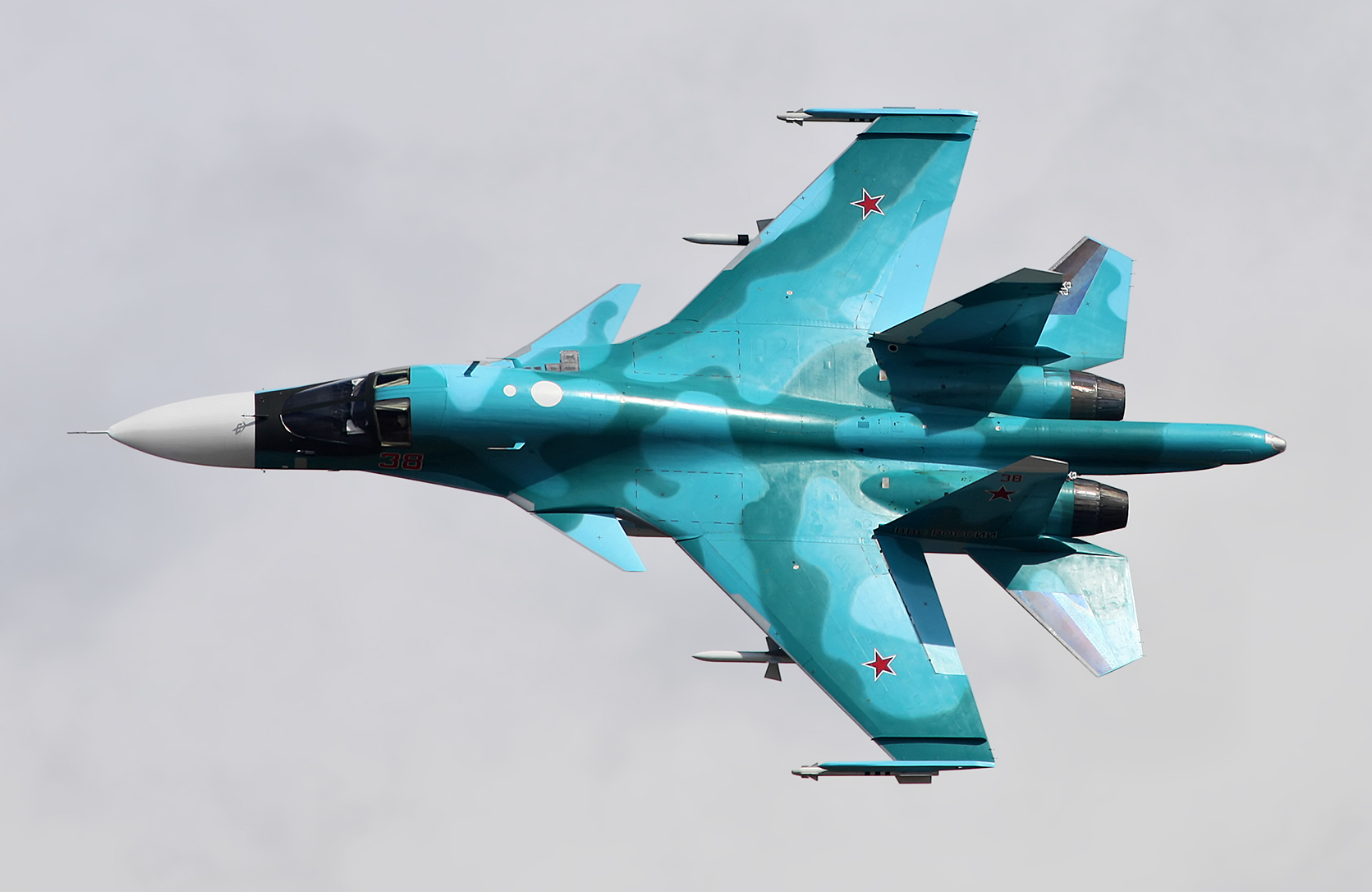
- A Russian Aerospace Forces Su-34 performing at the 2015 MAKS air show

General information
- Type: Fighter-bomber/strike fighter
- National origin: Soviet Union/Russia
- Manufacturer: Sukhoi, Novosibirsk Aircraft Production Association (NAPO)
- Status: In service
- Primary users: Russian Aerospace Forces Algerian Air Force
- Number built: 212

History
- Manufactured: 2006–present
- Introduction date: 20 March 2014
- First flight: 13 April 1990; 36 years ago
- Developed from: Sukhoi Su-27

The Sukhoi Su-34 (Russian: Сухой Су-34; NATO reporting name: Fullback) is a Soviet-origin Russian twin-engine, twin-seat, all-weather supersonic medium-range fighter-bomber/strike aircraft. It first flew in 1990, intended for the Soviet Air Forces, and it entered service in 2014 with the Russian Air Force.

Based on the Sukhoi Su-27 Flanker air superiority fighter, the Su-34 has a wider, armoured cockpit with side-by-side seating for its two pilots. The Su-34 was designed primarily for tactical deployment against ground and naval targets (tactical bombing/attack/interdiction roles, including against small and mobile targets) on solo and group missions in daytime and at night, under favourable and adverse weather conditions and in a hostile environment with counter-fire and electronic warfare (EW) counter-measures deployed, as well as for aerial reconnaissance. The Su-34 is planned to eventually replace the Su-24 tactical bomber and the Tu-22M long-range bomber.

== Development ==
=== Beginnings (1980s) ===
The Su-34 had a murky and protracted beginning. In the mid-1980s, Sukhoi began developing a new tactical multirole combat aircraft to replace the swing-wing Su-24, which would incorporate a host of conflicting requirements. The bureau thus selected the Su-27, which excelled in maneuverability and range, and could carry a large payload, as the basis for the new fighter-bomber. More specifically, the aircraft was developed from T10KM-2, the naval trainer derivative of the Sukhoi Su-27K. The development, known internally as T-10V, was shelved at the end of the 1980s sharing the fate of the aircraft carrier Ulyanovsk; this was the result of the political upheaval in the Soviet Union and its subsequent disintegration.

=== Prototypes (1990–1993) ===
In August 1990, a photograph taken by a TASS officer showed an aircraft making a dummy approach towards the aircraft carrier Tbilisi. The aircraft, subsequently and erroneously labelled Su-27KU (KU stands for Korebelnyi Uchebno, or "shipbased instructional") by Western intelligence, made its maiden flight on 13 April 1990 with Anatoliy Ivanov at the controls. Converted from an Su-27UB with the new distinctive nose, while retaining the main undercarriage of previous Su-27s, it was a prototype for the Su-27IB (IB stands for istrebitel-bombardirovshchik, or "fighter bomber"). It was developed in parallel with the two-seat naval trainer, the Su-27KUB. However, contrary to earlier reports, the two aircraft are not directly related. Flight tests continued throughout 1990 and into 1991.

In 1992, the Su-27IB was displayed to the public at the MosAeroshow (later renamed "MAKS Airshow"), where it demonstrated aerial refuelling with an Il-78, and performed an aerobatic display. The aircraft was officially unveiled on 13 February 1992 at Machulishchy (air base), where Russian president Boris Yeltsin and the Commonwealth of Independent States (CIS) leaders were holding a summit. The following year, the Su-27IB was again displayed at the MAKS Airshow.

The next prototype, and first pre-production aircraft, T10V-2, first flew on 18 December 1993, with Igor Votintsev and Yevgeniy Revoonov at the controls. Built at Novosibirsk, where Su-24s were constructed, this aircraft was visibly different from the original prototype; it had modified vertical stabilizers, twin tandem main undercarriage and a longer "stinger", which houses an APU in order to balance out the weight from the cockpit.

=== Standard Su-34 (1994) ===
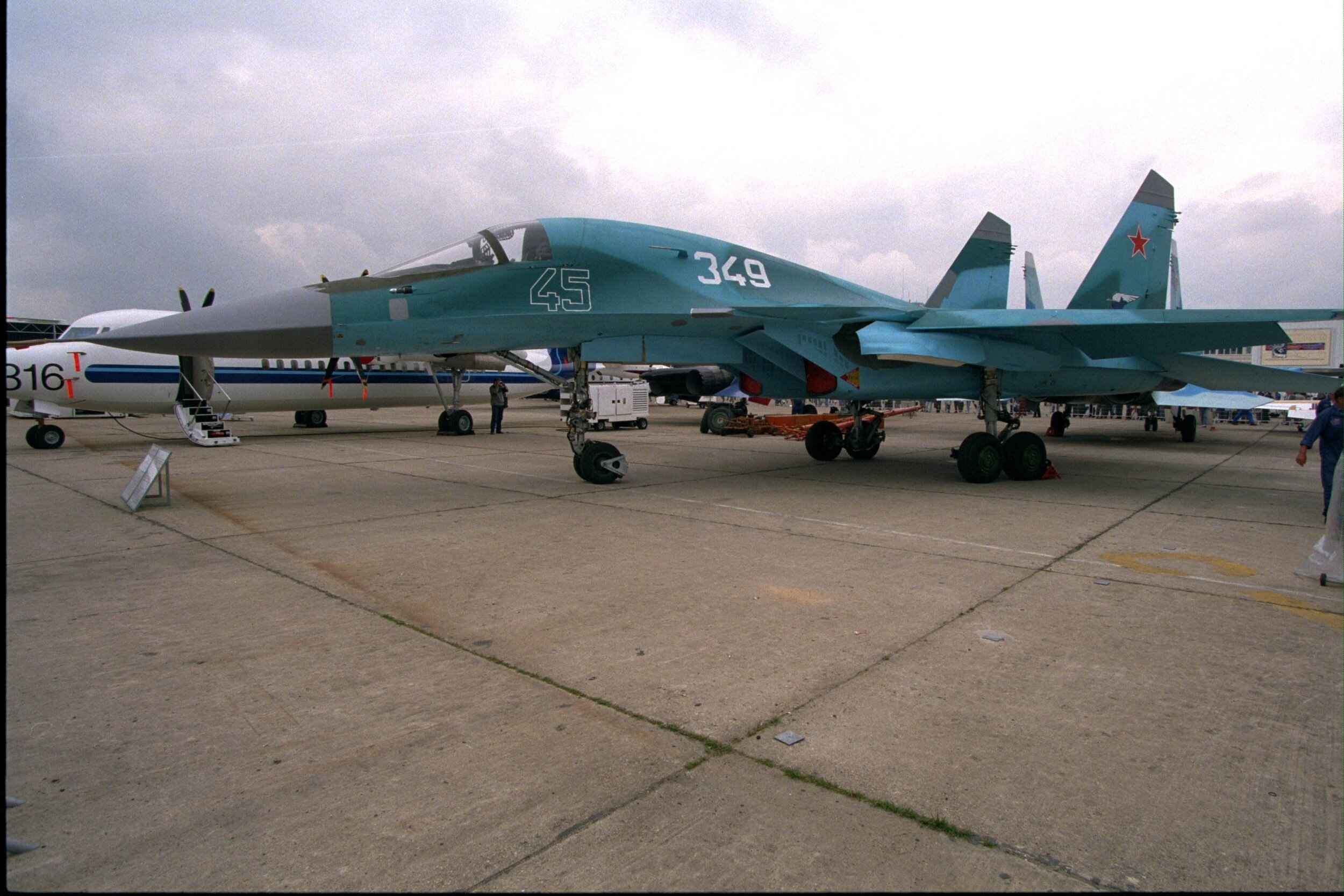
Su-32FN in Paris Airshow 1995

The first aircraft built to production standard made its maiden flight on 28 December 1994. It was fitted with a fire-control system, at the heart of which was the Leninets OKB-designed V004 passive electronically scanned array radar. It was different enough from the earlier versions that it was re-designated the "Su-34". However, at the 1995 Paris Air Show, the aircraft was allocated the "Su-32FN" designation, signalling the aircraft's potential role as a shore-based naval aircraft for the Russian Naval Aviation. Sukhoi also promoted the Su-34 as the "Su-32MF" (MnogoFunksionalniy, "multi-function").

Budget restrictions caused the programme to stall repeatedly. Nevertheless, flight testing continued, albeit at a slow pace. The third pre-production aircraft first flew in late 1996.

=== Further development (2016–present) ===
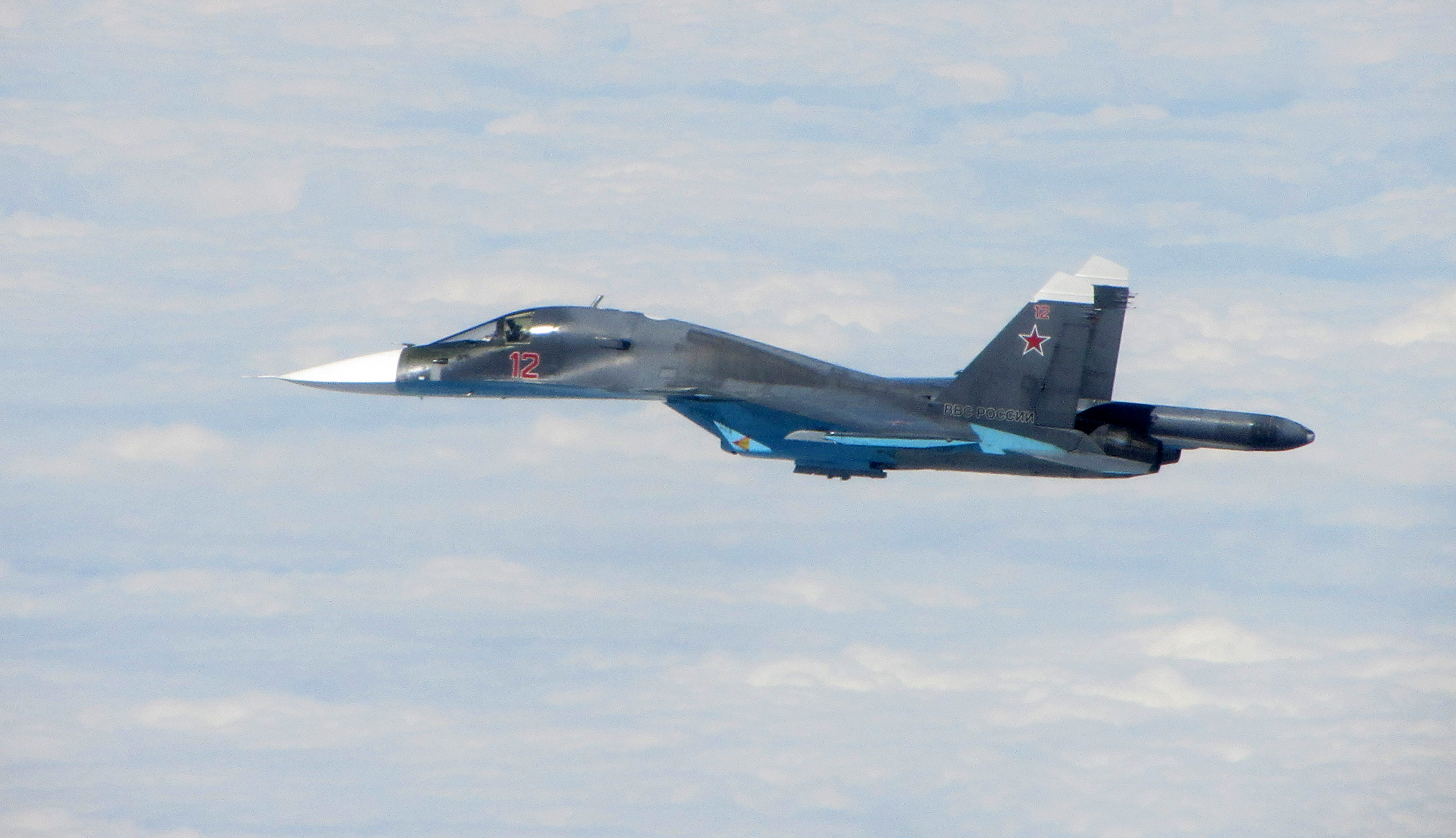
An Su-34 over the Baltic in 2015, photographed while being intercepted by the Royal Air Force

Russia's Ministry of Defence planned to modernize the Su-34; according to the deputy head of the military department, Yuriy Borisov, "We are planning to modernize the aircraft: prolong its service life, increase the number of airborne weapons. Plane is in great demand in our armed forces, and it has a great future."

Russia developed two new versions of the aircraft: one for electronic warfare (L700 Tarantul ECM pod can provide electronic cover for a group of aircraft) and one for intelligence, surveillance, and reconnaissance.

Su-34M modernised version features a new electro-optical infrared targeting pod, a Kopyo-DL rearward facing radar that can warn the pilots if missiles are approaching, combined with automatic deployment of countermeasures and jamming.

== Orders and deliveries ==
=== Su-34 (2004–2021) ===
An initial batch of eight aircraft was completed by the Novosibirsk factory in 2004. In March 2006, Russian Minister of Defence Sergei Ivanov announced the purchase of the first five pre-production Su-34s for the Russian Air Force. In late 2008, a second contract was signed for delivery of 32 aircraft by 2015. A total of 70 aircraft were to be purchased by 2015 to replace some 300 Su-24s in service at the time, which were then undergoing a modernization program. Ivanov claimed that as it is "many times more effective on all critical parameters", fewer of these newer bombers are required than the old Su-24 it replaces. In December 2006, Ivanov stated that approximately 200 Su-34s were expected to be in service by 2020. This was confirmed by Russian Air Force chief Vladimir Mikhaylov on 6 March 2007. Two Su-34s were delivered in 2006–2007, and three more were delivered by the end of 2009.

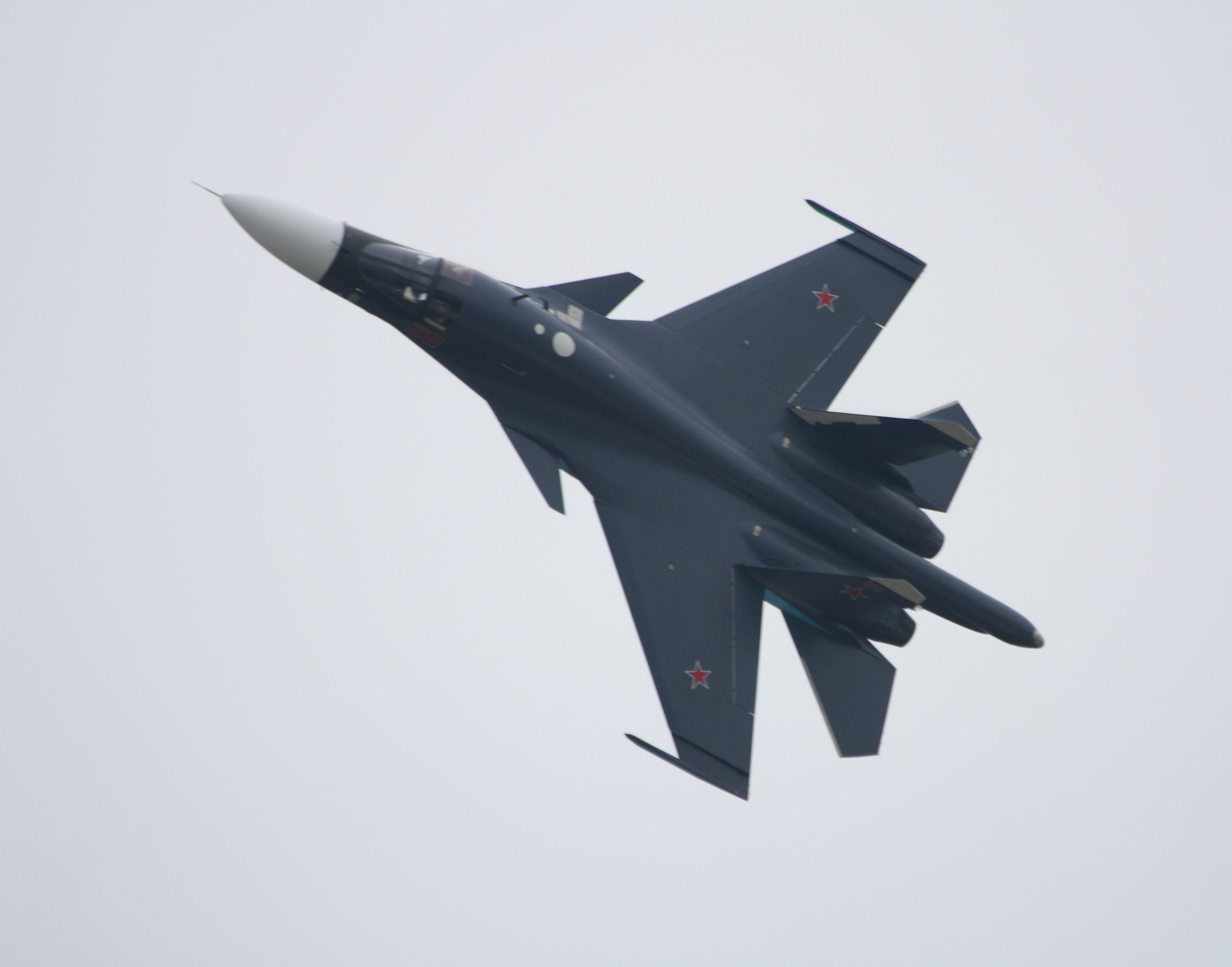
A Sukhoi Su-34 at MAKS-2013

On 9 January 2008, Sukhoi reported that the Su-34 had begun full-rate production. The final stage of the state tests were completed on 19 September 2011.

The Russian Air Force received another four Su-34s on 28 December 2010, as combat units in airbases first received six Su-34s in 2011. Delivery came in the form of two contracts, the first in 2008 for 32 aircraft and the second in 2012 for a further 92 aircraft, totaling 124 to be delivered by 2020.

In December 2012, Sukhoi reportedly delivered five aircraft under the 2012 State Defence Order.

On 6 May 2013, the first Su-34s under the 2013 defence procurement plan were delivered. On 9 July 2013, three more Su-34s were delivered in an official acceptance ceremony held at the Novosibirsk Aircraft Plant. By the end of 2013, Sukhoi completed the 2008 contract and started deliveries of aircraft under the 2012 contract.

In August 2013, Sukhoi ordered 184 identification friend or foe transponders for the Russian Su-34s from the Kazan-based Radiopribor holding company, to be delivered by 2020.

On 10 June 2014, a further delivery of Su-34s was made to the 559th Bomber Aviation Regiment at Morozovsk Air Base. Another three aircraft were delivered on 18 July 2014. In total, 18 aircraft were delivered in 2014, with 20 planned to be delivered in 2015.

Sukhoi delivered the first batch of Su-34s under the 2015 defence procurement plan on 21 May 2015. On 16 July 2015, the Sukhoi Company handed over another batch of Su-34s to the Russian Defence Ministry. The transfer took place in the framework of the Unified Military Hardware Acceptance Day in the Novosibirsk Aircraft Production Association Plant.

The last two Su-34s of the 2012 contract were delivered to the 968th Fighter Aviation Regiment at the Lipetsk Air Base in December 2020. This brought the total number of operational aircraft delivered to the Russian Aerospace Forces to 131 (not counting crashes and aircraft written off). Apart from this, also seven pre-production units were built under previous contracts.

On 25 August 2020, the Russian Defence Ministry signed a third contract for a further 24 Su-34 aircraft for the Russian Aerospace Forces. The deliveries will stretch over three years. By December 2021, the Russian Aerospace Forces received six new aircraft of the third order.

=== Su-34M (2022–present) ===
In June 2022, the Russian Aerospace Forces received another four aircraft of the third order. These were the first aircraft built under the new "Su-34M" standard. They became part of the 277th Bomber Aviation Regiment.

In August 2022, the Russian Ministry of Defence signed a new contract for supply of Su-34 bombers.

In November 2022, Russia received a new batch of Sukhoi Su-34s of the modernized Su-34M variant; the number is yet unknown but it is safe to assume it was at least four units. Another batch of modernized Su-34Ms was handed over to the Russian Aerospace Forces in late December 2022. At this point, the total number of Su-34s produced under all contracts, including seven prototypes and pre-production units, reached at least 153 units.

The delivery of new batches continued in June, October and November 2023. It was further reported that existing aircraft were gradually in the process of being upgraded to Su-34M standards, with updated onboard equipment.

By early 2024, the Centre for Analysis of Strategies and Technologies reported that 178 aircraft had been produced, inclusive of prototypes and pre-production units. New batches were delivered in April, June, September, October, November and December, with a minimum of 10 aircraft delivered throughout the year.

In 2025, batches were delivered in April, July, August, September, October, November and December.

The first batch for 2026 was delivered in July, the second in October, and the third in November. According to Ukrainian intelligence, Russia had about 140 Su-34s in action as of late October 2026 with 43 aircraft destroyed and another 7 damaged during the war.

== Design ==
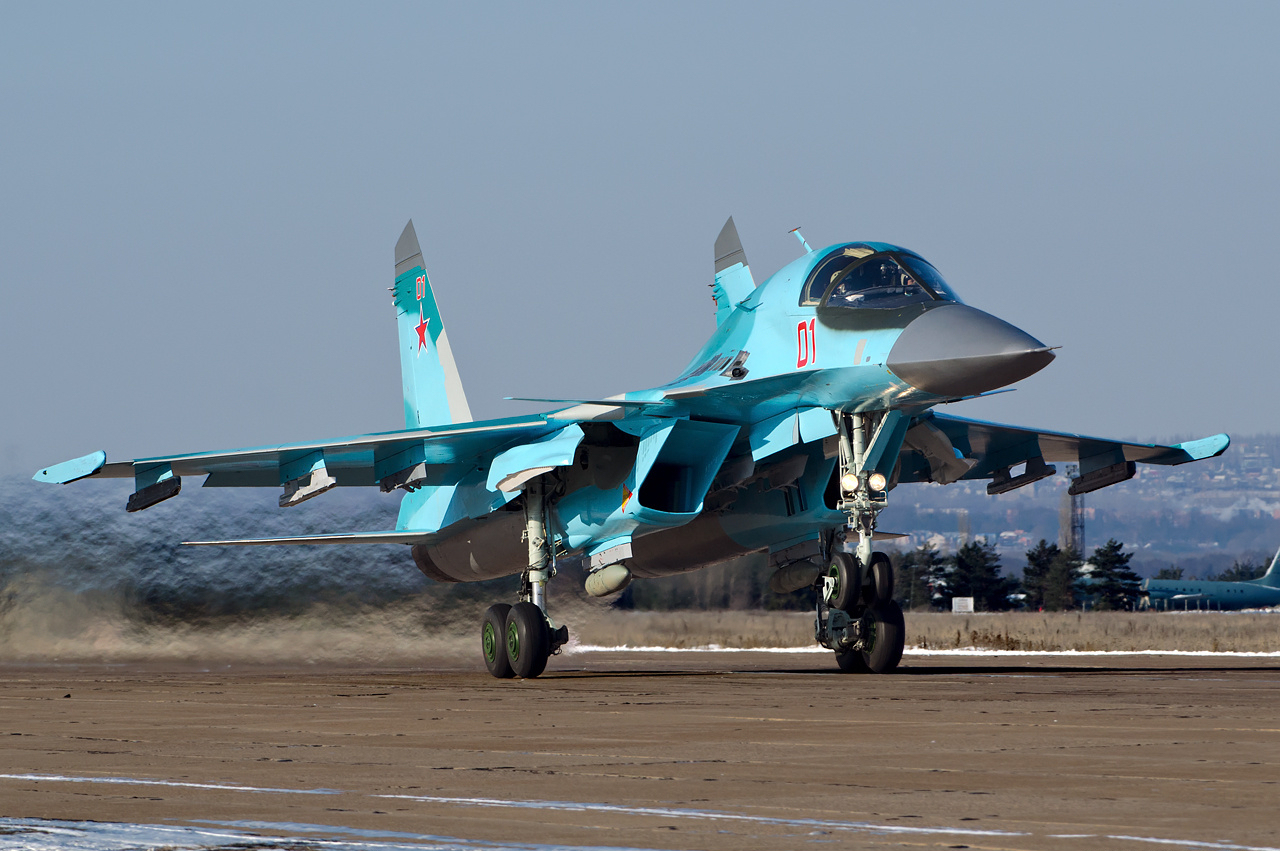
A Russian Air Force Su-34

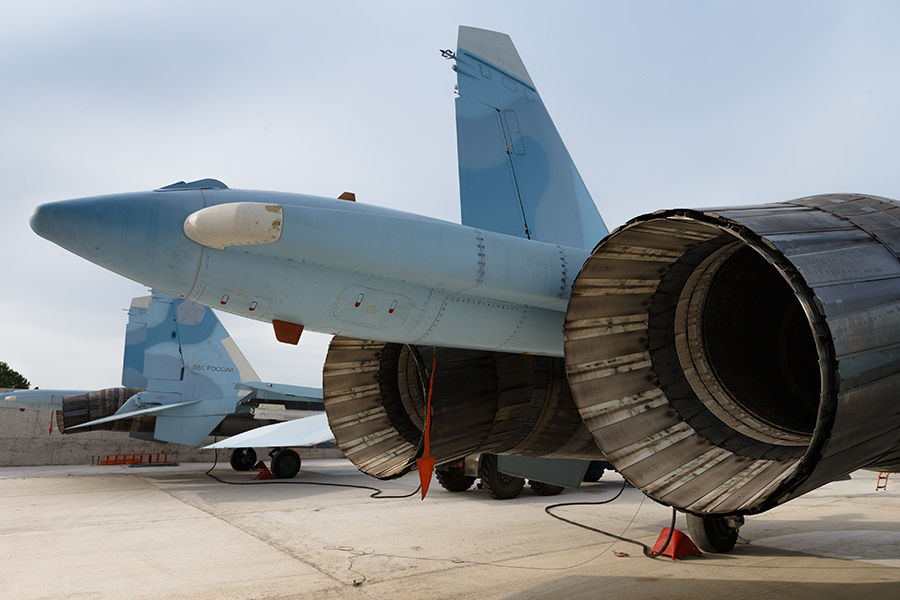
Tail cone between the two engine exhaust nozzles, which houses an auxiliary power unit (APU)

The Su-34 shares most of its wing structure, tail, and engine nacelles with the Su-27/Su-30, with canards like the Su-30MKI, Su-33 and Su-27M/35 to increase static instability (higher manoeuvrability) and to reduce trim drag.

The Su-34 is powered by a pair of Saturn AL-31FM1 turbofan engines, the same engines used on the Su-27SM, giving the aircraft a maximum speed of Mach 1.8+ when fully loaded. Although slower than the standard Su-27, the Su-34 can still handle high G-loads and perform aerobatic maneuvers. When equipped with a full weapons load, the Su-34 has a maximum range of 4,000 km (2,500 mi; 2,200 nmi), or further with aerial refueling. The airframe is cleared to perform maneuvers of up to +9 g. The noise level of the Su-34 is two times lower than the level of its predecessors.

The Su-34 is a three lifting surface design having both a conventional horizontal tailplane at the rear and a canard foreplane in front of the main wings. The foreplane provides both additional lift (force) and greater maneuverability. It has twin tail fins like those of Su-27 from which it is derived. The Su-34 has 12 hardpoints for 12,000–14,000 kg (26,000–31,000 lb) of ordnance, intended to include the latest Russian precision-guided weapons. It retains the 30 mm GSh-30-1 cannon of the Su-27 and Su-30, and the ability to carry six R-77 or R-73 air-to-air missiles, with these being primarily for defense against other fighters. The maximum weight of any single munition carried is 4,000 kg (8,800 lb). Its stand-off weapons have a range of up to 250 km (160 mi; 130 nmi). A Khibiny electronic countermeasures (ECM) system is fitted as standard.

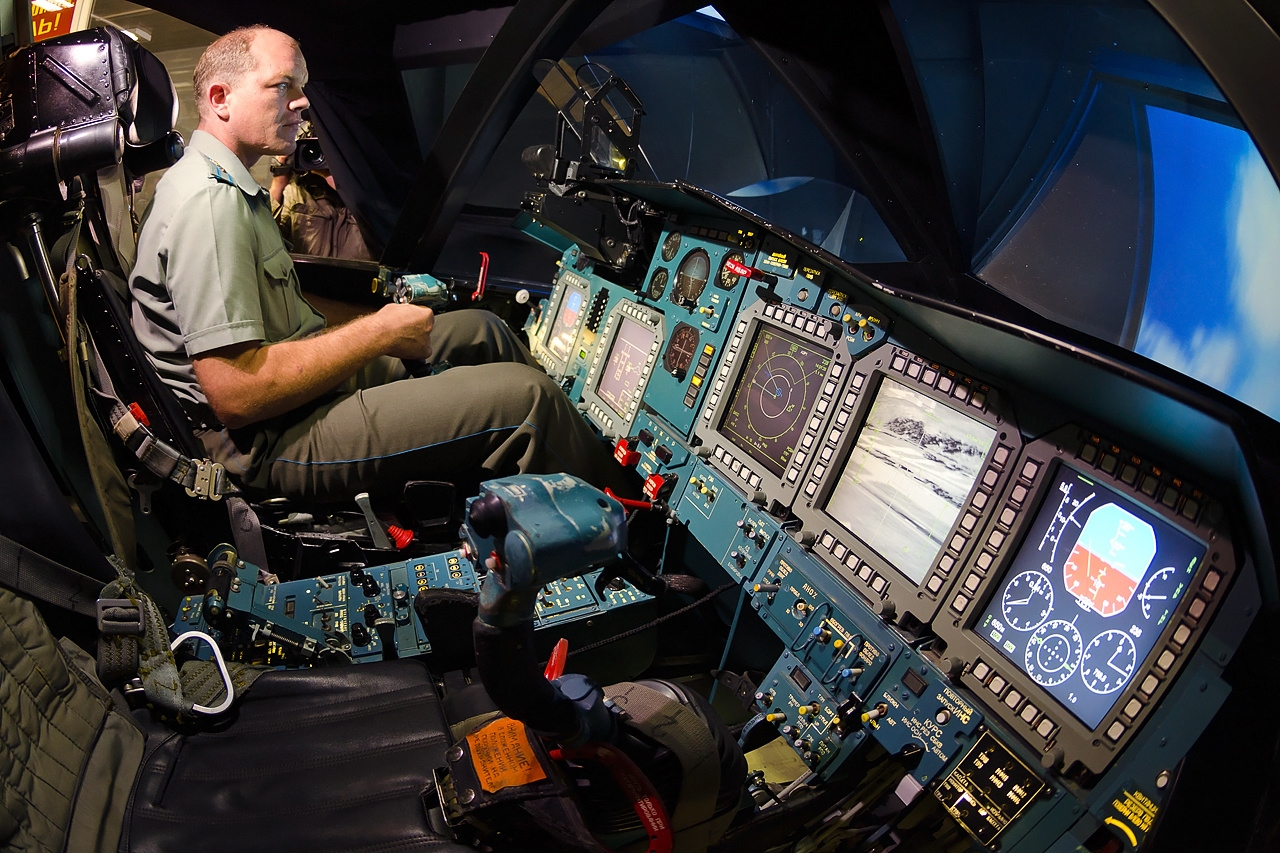
A Sukhoi Su-34 cockpit simulator

Compared to other members of the Flanker family, the Su-34 has an entirely new "Duckbill" nose and forward fuselage designed to increase cabin room and maximize crew comfort and safety, giving the Su-34 the nickname "Duckling", "Hellduck" or "Platypus". The two pilots sit side-by-side in NPP Zvezda K-36DM ejection seats: the pilot-commander on the left with the navigator and weapon operator on the right. An advantage of the side by side cockpit is that duplicate instruments are not required for each pilot. Since long missions require comfort, the pressurization system allows operation up to 10,000 metres (32,800 ft) without oxygen masks, which are available for emergencies and combat situations.

The crew members have room to stand and move about the cabin during long missions. The space between the seats allows them to lie down, if necessary. A hand-held urinal "toilet" and vacuum flask "kitchen" are provided. A ladder attached to the nose landing gear and a hatch in the cockpit floor is used to enter the cockpit. The cockpit is a continuous capsule of armour (17 mm).

The multifunctional Leninets V004 main radar has terrain-following and terrain avoidance modes. Maximum detection range for the passive electronically scanned array radar is 200–250 km (120–160 mi; 110–130 nmi) against large surface targets. The main radar can simultaneously track ten air targets and attack four targets (in the air, on land or on the water). The radius of detection for fighter-sized targets is up to 120 km, the range of the survey is +/- 60 degrees. The Su-34 reportedly has a frontal radar cross-section that is an order of magnitude smaller than prior generation fighters.

A new 4th generation radar Pika-M of the complex BKR-3, having a range up to 300 km, passed state tests in 2016. As of 2021, several aircraft of the RuAF have passed modernization with special equipment that increases capabilities in detecting air and ground targets and expand the types of weapons used.

== Operational history ==
=== Russia ===
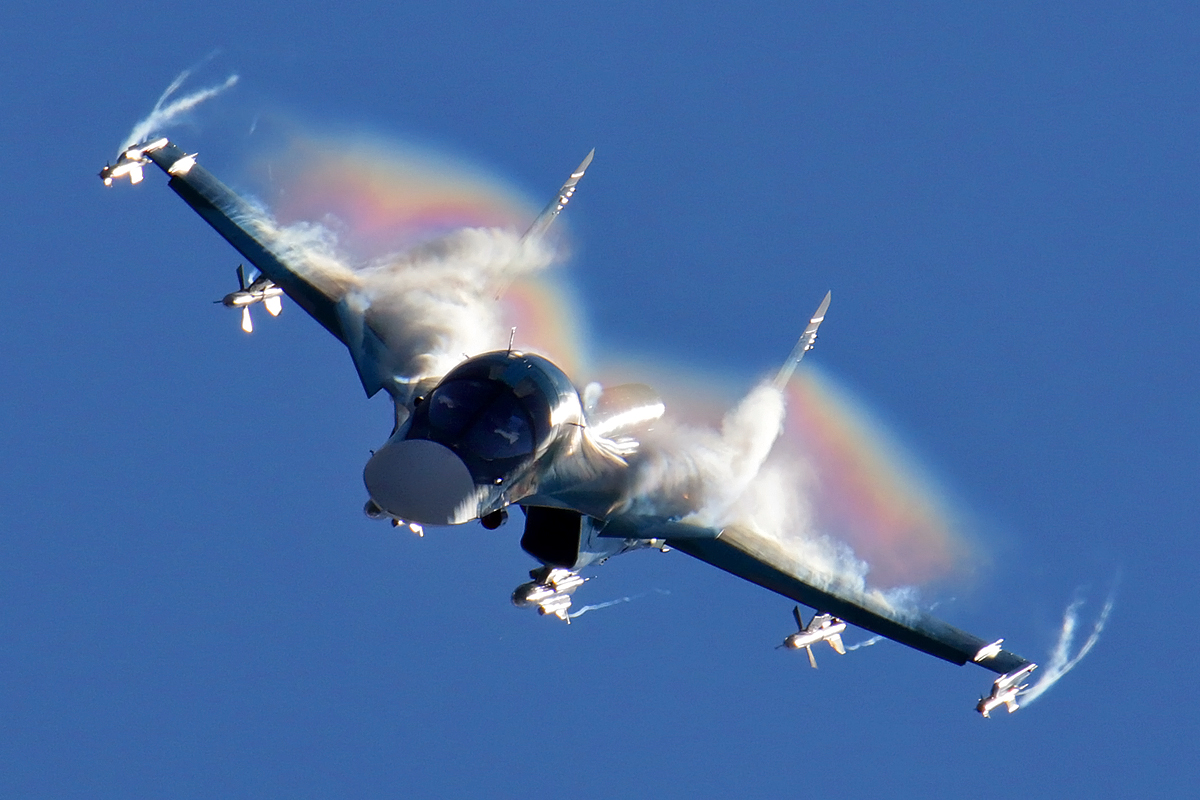
Sukhoi Su-34 fighter-bomber

==== Trials, early service ====
The Su-34 is rumoured to have made its combat debut during the 2008 Russo-Georgian War.

In July 2010, several Su-34s and Su-24Ms conducted a 6,000 km (3,700 mi; 3,200 nmi) non-stop flight from air bases in European Russia to the Russian Far East. The exercise included aircraft carrying weapons at full load and simulated delivering them on targets, demonstrating the Su-34's long-range capability. The Su-24Ms were refuelled three times, while the Su-34s were refuelled twice.

The final stage of the Su-34's state trials was completed on 19 September 2011 and the aircraft entered service in early 2014.

==== Crashes, other accidents ====
- On 4 June 2015, an Su-34 slid off the runway and flipped over when its parachute failed to open after landing. Nobody was injured. The aircraft was returning from a routine training mission in Russia's Voronezh region. In June 2016, the damaged aircraft was transferred on board an Antonov An-124 to the Novosibirsk Aircraft Production Association plant for repairs, and was likely returned to service the same year.
- On 18 January 2019, two Su-34s collided mid-air in Russia's Far East region, while performing a scheduled training flight. Two pilots were killed, one was rescued and one remained missing. All Su-34 flights were suspended throughout Russia following the accident.
- On 6 September 2019, two Su-34s again collided mid-air, this time in the western Russian city of Lipetsk. According to a Russian source the collision happened due to pilot error. Both pilots managed to land after the accident.
- On 21 October 2020, an Su-34 crashed performing a training flight in Khabarovsk region.
- On 17 October 2022, a Russian Su-34 fighter-bomber crashed into the courtyard of a residential apartment complex in the Russian city of Yeysk during a training flight, setting two blocks on fire. 15 people were killed and 19 were treated in hospital. A school was evacuated. Russian defense ministry sources stated the cause of the crash was an engine fire on takeoff and that both pilots ejected safely. Locals were seen rescuing one of the pilots. Russian naval aviation uses Yeysk as a main training area.
- On 20 April 2023, an Su-34 of the Russian Aerospace Forces was performing a flight over the Russian city of Belgorod when a release of an air ordnance occurred, shattering windows, damaging cars and leaving a crater of about 20 meters in diameter. Three people were injured.
- On 20 September 2023, an Su-34 "Red 05", RF-95806 crashed in Russia's Voronezh region, without any damage to personnel or ground structures. Both pilots ejected safely.
- On 10 June 2024, an Su-34 crashed during a training flight in the mountains of North Ossetia, killing both pilots.

==== Syrian Civil War ====
===== (2015–2020) =====
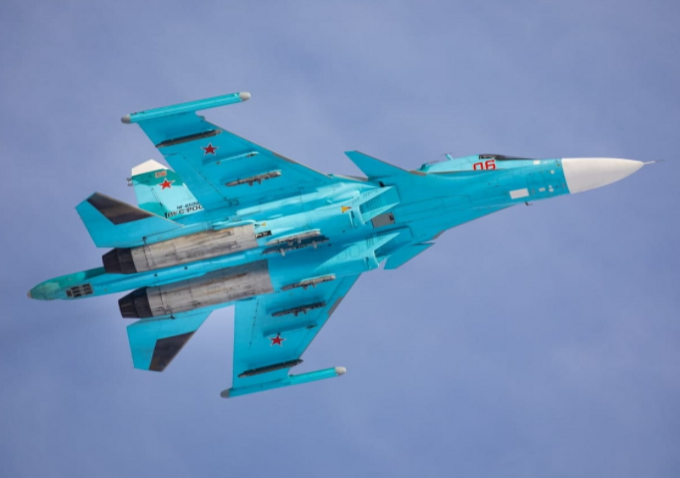
An Su-34, bottom view

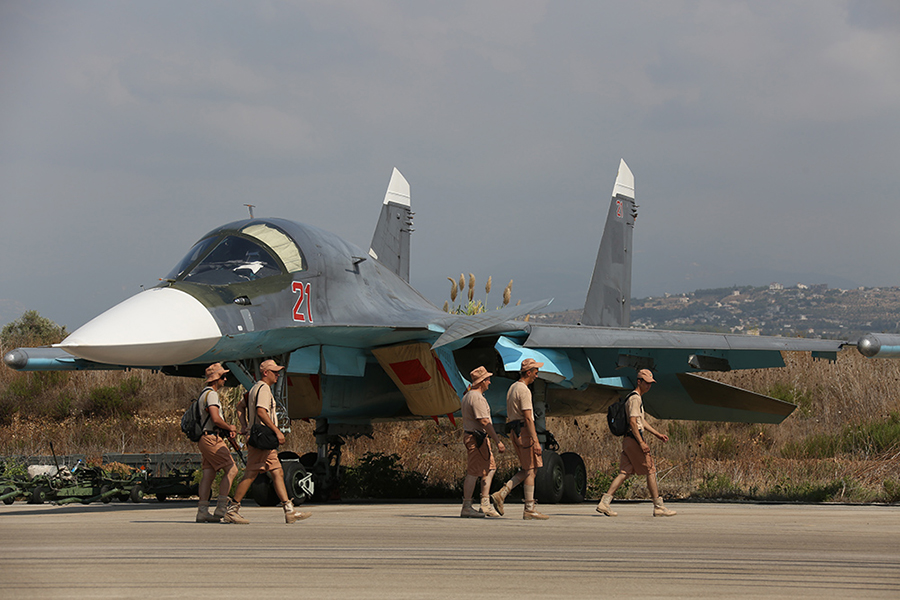
An Su-34 at Latakia International Airport, Syria, in late 2015, early in Russia's intervention in Syria

In September 2015, six Su-34s arrived at Latakia airport in Syria, for attacks against rebel and ISIL forces. Russian air attacks in Syria started on 30 September, in the Homs region. On 1 October, the Su-34 was used to bomb Islamic State targets in Syria. The Russian Aerospace Forces Su-34 fighter-bombers destroyed an Islamic State command center and training camp south-west of the city of Raqqa. These included precision strikes from an altitude of over 5,000 m (16,400 ft).

Russian Su-34 and Su-25 attack aircraft carried out air strikes the next day against Islamic State targets in Syria's Hama province using precision bombs. According to Russian Defense Ministry spokesman Maj. Gen. Igor Konashenkov, Su-34s hit an ISIL fortified bunker in the Hama province with guided bombs. Fortifications, ammunition depots, seven units of the military equipment near Syria's Maarrat al-Numan were also destroyed by the Russian Aerospace Forces. An ISIL command center and underground depot were also destroyed with explosives near Raqqa.

Defense Ministry spokesman, Maj. Gen. Igor Konashenkov, said in a statement on 3 October: "Accurate delivery of a concrete-piercing bomb BETAB-500 launched from an Su-34 aircraft near Raqqa destroyed a hardened command centre of one of the illegal armed groups as well as an underground bunker with explosives and an ammunition depot." A Russian Aerospace Forces representative stated Su-34s acquire targets using the GLONASS satellite system for bombing. During this time six Su-34s were in Syria.

Following the downing of an Su-24 by Turkey, Russia announced on 30 November 2015 that Su-34s in Syria had begun flying combat missions while armed with air-to-air missiles. On 16 August 2016, Tu-22M3 long-range bombers and Su-34 bombers, having taken off from their base in Hamadan, Islamic Republic of Iran, carried out group airstrikes against targets belonging to ISIS and Jabhat al-Nusra terrorist groups in the provinces of Aleppo, Deir ez-Zor and Idlib.

On 3 October 2017, Russian Su-34s and Su-35s were deployed to strike "the place of the Al-Nusra leadership meeting" whose location was discovered by Russian military intelligence in Syria subsequently eliminating 12 Al-Nusra field commanders and some 50 militants of the group including Ahmad al-Ghizai, Al-Nusra's security chief according to the Russian Defense Ministry.

On 28 May 2018, it was reported that Russian Su-34s intercepted two Israeli Air Force F-16s over Tripoli, Lebanon, forcing them to retreat.

On 27 February 2020, two Russian Su-34s allegedly carried out an airstrike on a Turkish military convoy killing up to 36 soldiers and injuring at least 60 more in Balyun, Syria.

On 6 October 2020, two Russian Su-34s conducted air strikes against underground structures in the Eastern bank of Euphrates, Deir Ez-Zor province allegedly inside Rojava territory resulting in the death of ISIL field commander Abu Qatada, who was involved in preparing an attack against Russian forces which resulted in the death of Major General Vyacheslav Gladkikh. Additionally, the strike also destroyed two underground shelters and killed some 30 militants.

==== Russo-Ukrainian War ====
===== Russian invasion of Ukraine (2022–present) =====
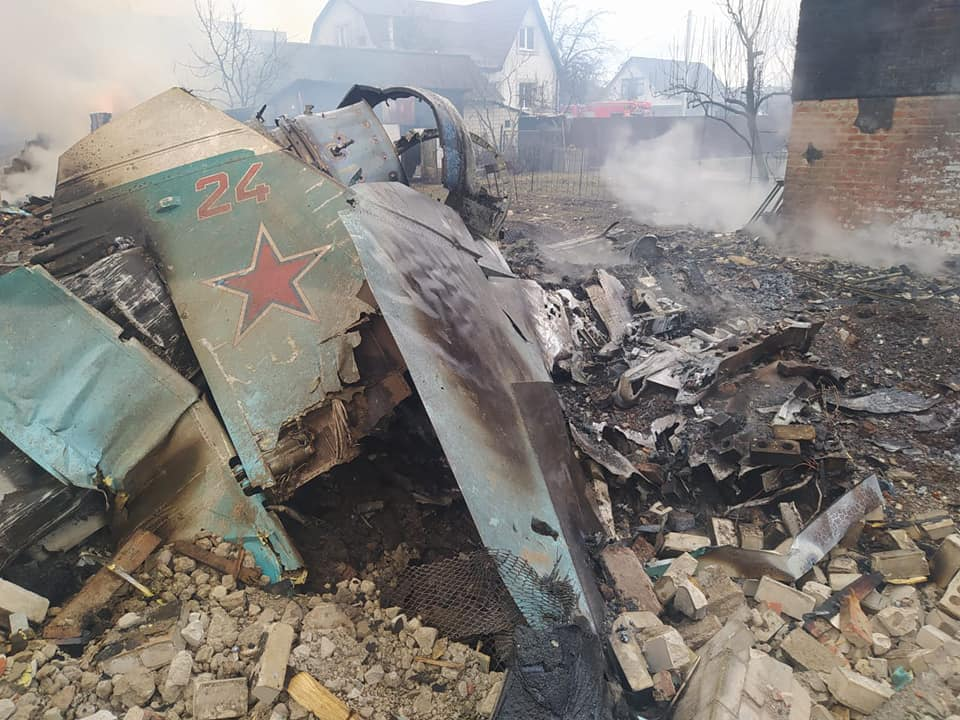
А Russian Su-34 with bombs shot down over Chernihiv on 5 March 2022

On 28 February 2022, footage emerged reportedly showing Su-34s overflying the Kharkiv region of Ukraine.

Until the deployment of the Russian GPS-guided UMPK (Unified Gliding and Correction Module) bomb kits in 2023, a lack of guided bombs required the Su-34s to fly low for accurate bombing, where they were subjected to heavy Ukrainian air-defenses.

As at 16 February 2025, there have been 36 Su-34s and one Su-34M visually confirmed as being lost, damaged or abandoned by Russian forces since the start of the 2022 Russian invasion of Ukraine (29 destroyed in combat, 4 destroyed in a non-combat related incident and 4 damaged). Ukraine launched several surprise attacks on Su-34 fighter bombers in the occupied south of Kherson and Mariupol using American-supplied long-range MIM-104 Patriot missiles, causing significant losses of Su-34s. As Ukraine fought on, Russia lost almost 36 Su-34 fighter bombers until June 2024. According to Oryx (website), 41 Su-34s have been damaged or destroyed as of July 2025.

====== Dated list of Su-34s shot down in the Russo-Ukrainian War ======
2022

- The first Su-34 shot down during combat occurred a few days after the beginning of the war on 28 February 2022, near the Buzova airfield.
- On 1 March, another Su-34 "Red 31", RF-81251 was lost near Borodyanka, Kyiv region.
- On 5 March, a Su-34 "Red 26", RF-81864 was lost in the area of Hrabivka, Chernihiv Oblast. Both crew members were killed.
- On 6 March, a Su-34 RF-95070 was lost over the city of Kharkiv.
- On 10 March, a Su-34 reportedly crashed near Kozhan-Gorodok, Belarus, 17 km from the Luninets (air base). Both pilots ejected safely.
- On 14 March, a Su-34 "Red 35", RF-95010 was lost somewhere over Ukraine.
- On 21 April, a Su-34 "Red 43", RF-95858 was lost in Zaporizhzhia Oblast.
- On 25 April, a Su-34 "Red 24", RF-95808 was lost near Balakliya, Kharkiv Oblast.
- On 18 May, a Su-34 was lost near Kupiansk, Kharkiv Oblast. Senior lieutenant Fetisov Vladimir Nikolayevich died during the crash.
- On 17 July, a modernized Su-34M reportedly "Red 51", RF-95890 was shot down due to a friendly fire incident near Alchevsk, Luhansk Oblast.
- On 10 September, wreckage of a Su-34 "Red 20", RF-95004 was found near Izyum, Kharkiv Oblast. It is not known when the plane was shot down.
- On 11 September, a Su-34 crashed in the area of Vorontsivka, Krasnoperekopsky district, Crimea. Both pilots ejected safely.
- On 24 September, a Su-34 "Red 22", RF-95005 was lost over Petropavlivka, Kharkiv Oblast. Both crew members ejected and survived.
- On 2 October, wreckage of a Su-34 "Red 09", RF-81852 was discovered in Lyman after Russian retreat. Exact crash date is not known.

2023

- On 3 March, a Su-34 was shot down over Yenakiieve, Donetsk Oblast. One crew member, major Alexander Bondarev, did not survive.
- On 13 May, a Su-34 from the 47th Aviation Regiment was shot down over Starodubsky District, Bryansk Oblast, Russia. Both crew members died.
- On 17 December, a Su-34 parked at Morozovsk air base sustained minor damage due to Ukrainian drone attack. The aircraft was protected by anti-drone netting and was covered by ice build up on its airframe.
- On 22 December, Ukrainian official sources claimed shootdown of three Su-34s in southern Ukraine by surface-to-air missiles. At least one loss was confirmed by Russian Telegram channel Fighterbomber, associated with the Russian Aerospace Forces.

2024

- On 4 January, it was reported a saboteur attempted to set fire to a Su-34 parked at the Chelyabinsk Shagol Airport. A video of the act was published by Ukrainian GUR. The saboteur attempted to ignite a fire inside the right air intake of the aircraft but was unsuccessful due to distance between the air intake itself and the engine. The following day on 5 January 2024, it was reported that the Russian Federal Security Service detained a Russian national who was allegedly involved in the sabotage.

====== Unconfirmed losses claimed by Ukraine ======
- On 30 January 2024, Ukrainian forces claimed an Su-34 was shot down over Luhansk Oblast, Eastern Ukraine. Mykola Oleshchuk, a Ukrainian General said, "Units of the Air Forces of the Armed Forces of Ukraine destroyed three enemy aircraft at once—two Su-34 fighter-bombers and one Su-35 fighter," on Telegram on February 17. He said Ukraine shot down another Su-34 fighter-bomber on the morning of February 18. Oleshchuk said that Ukrainian forces took down additional Su-34 fighter bombers, the seventh Su-34 plane reportedly destroyed by Ukraine within the week. On 27 February 2024 Oleshchuk reported that Ukrainian forces shot down an Su-34 on the eastern front. Later that day another Su-34 was reportedly shot down by Ukrainian forces. On 29 February Ukraine claimed it shot down three Su-34s. In total in February 2024 the Ukrainian Air Force claimed it had shot down ten Su-34s. As of 27 February 2024, none of the claims have been independently verified.
- On the night of 13–14 June 2024, officials from the Ukrainian GUR claimed that two Su-34s were damaged during a Ukrainian drone strike on the Morozovsk air base. There are reports of casualties however these were not officially confirmed.
- On 14 August 2024, the Ukrainian military claimed to have shot down an Su-34 over Kursk Oblast.
- On 27 June 2025, the Ukrainian military claimed to have destroyed four Su-34s at Marinovka airfield, Volgograd region of Russia.
- On the night of 24–25 September 2025, the Ukrainian military claimed to have destroyed an Su-34 over the city of Zaporizhzhia.
- On 15 October 2026, the Borisoglebsk air base was attacked by Neptune missiles, and Ukraine claimed six Su-34s were destroyed along with their support equipment.
- On 30 October 2026, a Neptune missile strike destroyed two Su-34s at the Marinovka Air Base.

==== Non-military usage ====
Sukhoi Su-34s were used on bombing runs against ice jams on the rivers in Vologda Oblast to prevent floods during the spring of 2016.

=== Algerian purchase ===
In January 2016, Algeria was negotiating a purchase of 12 aircraft for its Air Force. The deal should have been signed in late 2016, but in 2017 the talks were still ongoing and no sale was made. On 27 December 2019, Algeria reportedly signed a contract for 14 aircraft as part of large military deal that also includes purchase of Su-35 and Su-57 fighters. However, neither the Russian nor Algerian governments ever confirmed that such a deal had been made.

According to Mil.press, after eight years of fruitless negotiations with Algeria on selling Su-32 (export version), in 2019 Russia agreed to sell the modernized, non-downgraded Su-34ME version; Algeria became interested in the model after the campaign in Syria, where the aircraft demonstrated excellent combat qualities. Production of the first batch was underway as of March 2021 and, according to CAWAT, should be ready in 2021. Training of Algerian pilots would commence in 2022, with all planes to be delivered by 2023. According to a 17 March 2021 news article from Middle East Monitor (MEMO), a representative of the Federal Service for Military-Technical Cooperation (FSVTS) in Russia denied the claim that Russia was manufacturing aircraft for Algeria.

However, the appearance of a Su-34 in a new desert brown and yellow color scheme in mid-May 2025 has fueled speculation that the aircraft have for the first time begun to be produced for export, most likely to Algeria, but possibly to another client with a similar climate such as Iran or Sudan.

== Variants ==
- Su-34 – basic aircraft model.
- Su-32 – export model offered to Algeria in 2012. Not currently offered.
- Su-34E – current export model
- Su-34M / Su-34 NVO (Навигация и Внешнее Оборудование, Navigation and External Equipment Upgrade) – modernized version, also known as Su-34 Sych (Russian for Athene). The Russian contract was signed in 2020 and replaced basic Su-34 in production. According to reports, this upgrade seriously affects almost all of the aircraft's avionics. The radar, sight, and communication systems improved. The range of guided munitions that the bomber can use significantly expanded. EW capabilities also expanded with introduction of new hardpoints. The version was reportedly armed with long range cruise missiles in September 2023. An armed reconnaissance version entered service in July 2025.

== Operators ==
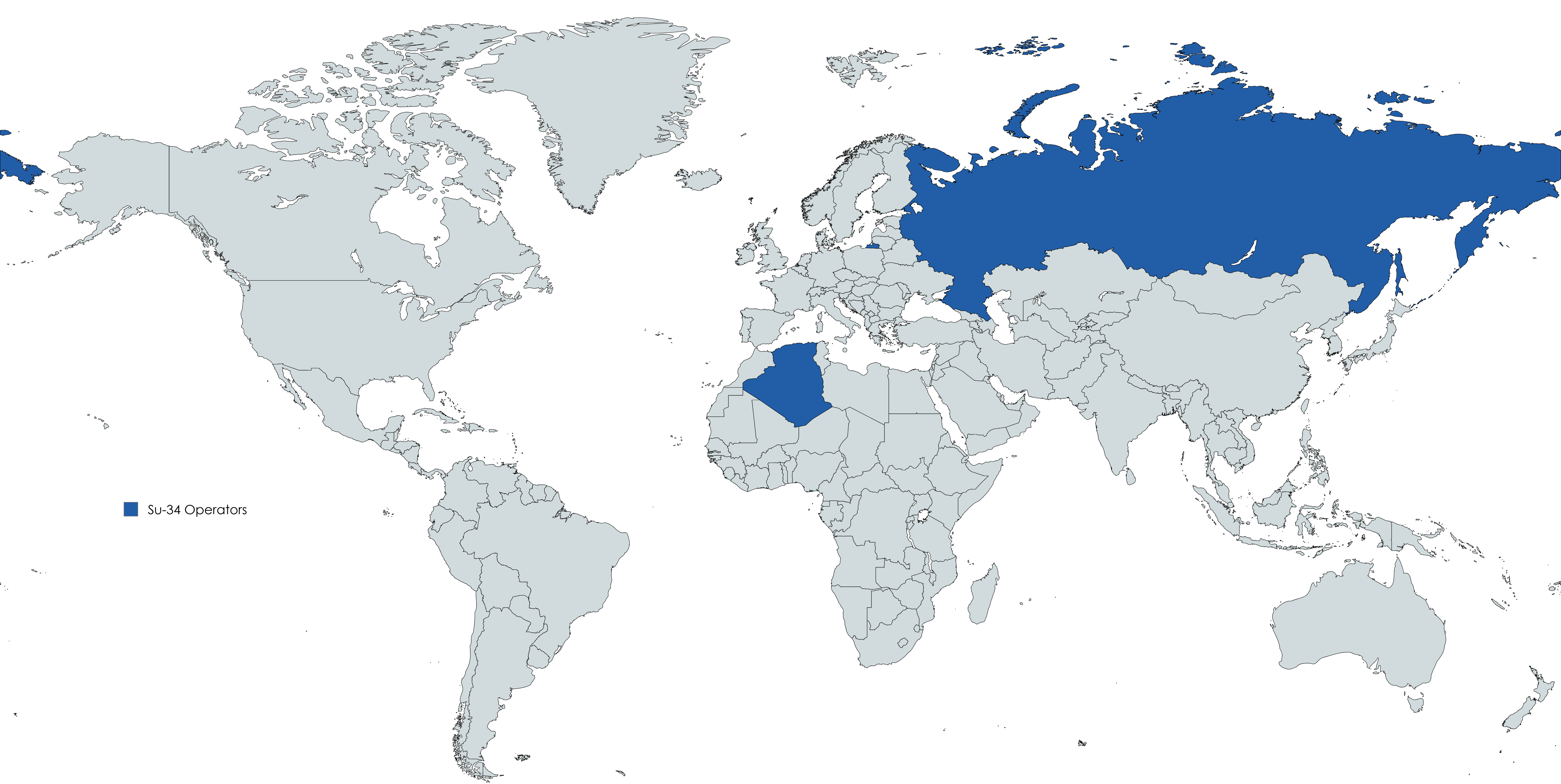
Su-34 operators

Russia

- Russian Aerospace Forces
  - 47th Bomber Aviation Regiment – Baltimor Air Base, Voronezh Oblast
  - 277th Bomber Aviation Regiment – Khurba Air Base, Khabarovsk Krai
  - 559th Bomber Aviation Regiment – Morozovsk Air Base, Rostov Oblast
  - 2nd Guards Bomber Aviation Regiment – Chelyabinsk Shagol Airport, Chelyabinsk Oblast
  - 4th Centre for Combat Employment and Retraining of Personnel – Lipetsk Air Base, Lipetsk Oblast
  - State Flight Testing Center named after V.P. Chkalov – Akhtubinsk Air Base, Astrakhan Oblast
  - Khmeimim Air Base, Latakia, Syria

Algeria

- Algerian Air Force
  - The first Su-34ME aircraft were reportedly delivered in 2025. Algeria originally ordered 14 Su-34ME fighters from Russia. In May 2026, a footage released by Russian sources confirmed for the first time the arrival of four Su-34MEs to the Algerian Air Force.

== Specifications (Su-34) ==
Su-34 three-view illustration

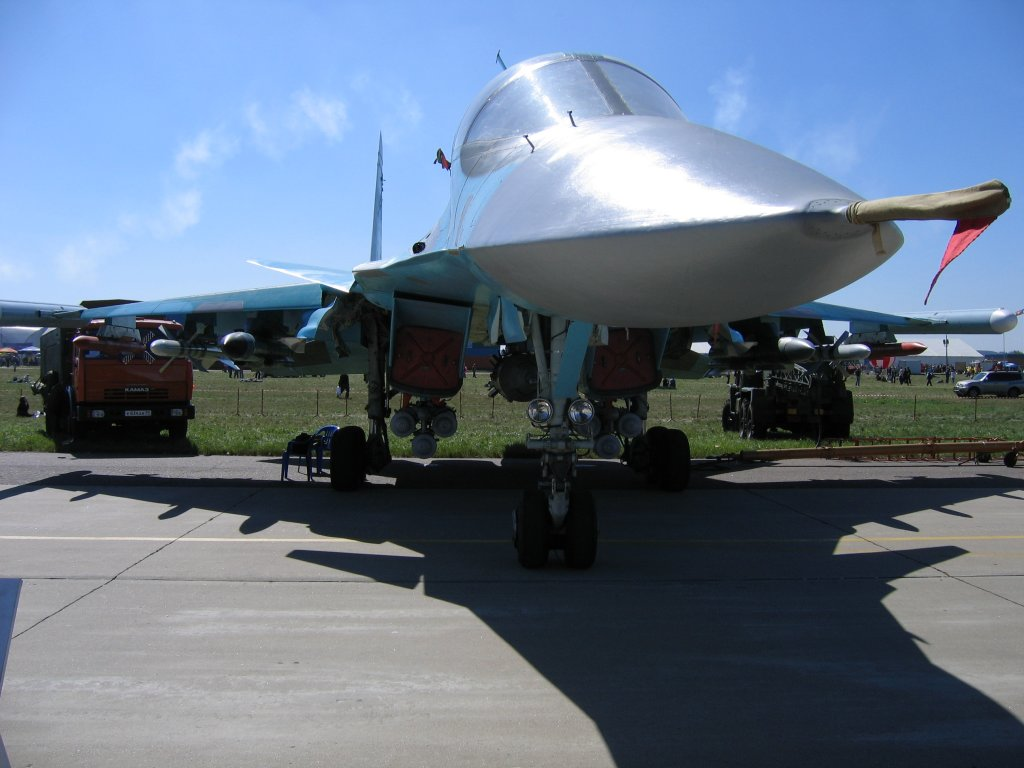
A front view of the Su-34

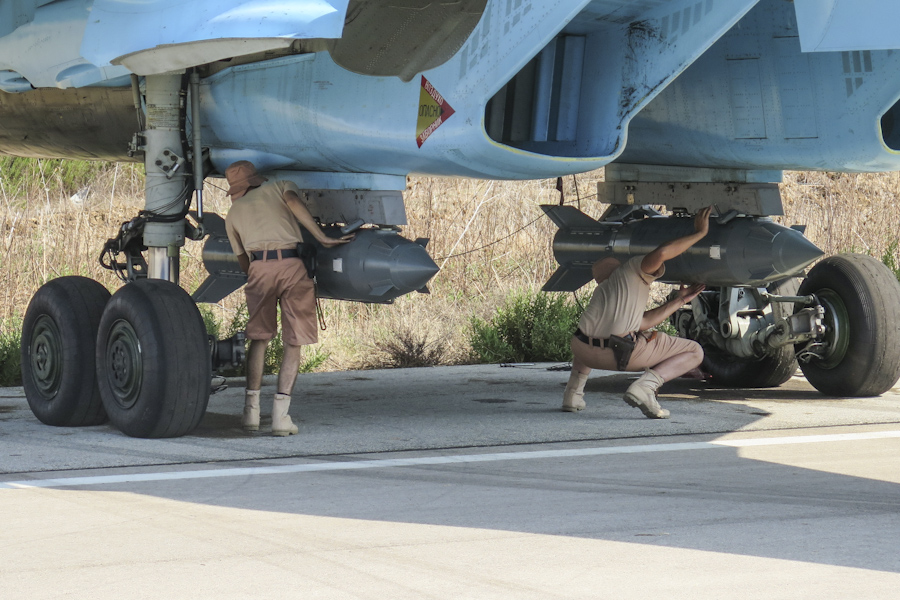
Fixing KAB-500S GLONASS Satellite-guided bombs to a Sukhoi Su-34 at Latakia International Airport, 2015

Data from Sukhoi, Gordon and Davison, airforce-technology.com, airwar.ru, ria.ru, deagel.com

General characteristics

- Crew: 2 (side by side seating)
- Length: 23.34 m (76 ft 7 in)
- Wingspan: 14.7 m (48 ft 3 in)
- Height: 6.09 m (20 ft 0 in)
- Wing area: 62.04 m^{2} (667.8 sq ft)
- Airfoil: 5%
- Empty weight: 22,500 kg (49,604 lb)
- Gross weight: 39,000 kg (85,980 lb)
- Max takeoff weight: 45,100 kg (99,428 lb)
- Fuel capacity: 12,100 kg (26,676 lb) internals
- Powerplant: 2 × Saturn AL-31FM1 afterburning turbofan engines, 132 kN (30,000 lbf) with afterburner

Performance

- Maximum speed: 1,900 km/h (1,200 mph, 1,000 kn) (Mach 1.8) at altitude

1,435 km/h (892 mph; 775 kn) / Mach 1.2 at sea level

- Cruise speed: 1,300 km/h (810 mph, 700 kn)
- Combat range: 1,100 km (680 mi, 590 nmi) (radius of action with standard 12,000 kg weapons load)
- Ferry range: 4,500 km (2,800 mi, 2,400 nmi)
- Service ceiling: 17,000 m (56,000 ft)
- g limits: +9
- Thrust/weight: 0.68

Armament

- Guns: 1 × 30 mm Gryazev-Shipunov GSh-30-1 autocannon with 180 rounds
- Hardpoints: 12 × on wing and fuselage with a capacity of 12,000–14,000 kilograms (26,000–31,000 lb)
    - B-8 rocket pods for 20 × S-8KOM/OM/BM
    - B-13 rocket pods for 5 × S-13T/OF
    - O-25 rocket pods for 1 × S-25OFM-PU
    - S-80FP, with provisions to carry combinations of:
  - Missiles:
    - Air-to-air missiles:
      - R-27R/ER/T/ET
      - R-73
      - R-77
    - Air-to-surface missiles:
      - Kh-25ML/MT
      - Kh-29L/T/D
      - Kh-31A/AD
      - Kh-35U
      - Kh-38MAE/MKE/MLE/MTE
      - Kh-58
      - Kh-59ME/MK/MK2
      - Kh-47M2
    - Anti-ship missiles:
      - P-800 Oniks weight of 1500 kg with a range of up to 300 km and a speed in the range of numbers Mach 2.2–3.0. Officially not in service.
      - Kh-41
    - Anti-radiation missiles:
      - Kh-25MP
      - Kh-58
      - Kh-31P/PD
    - Cruise missiles:
      - Kh-36 Grom-E1
      - Kh-65S/SE
      - Kh-SD
  - Bombs:
    - KAB-500Kr TV-guided bomb
    - KAB-500L laser-guided bomb
    - KAB-500OD guided bomb
    - KAB-500S-E satellite-guided bomb
    - KAB-1500Kr TV-guided bomb
    - KAB-1500L laser-guided bomb
    - OFAB-250-270 bomb
    - OFAB-100-120 bomb
    - FAB-500T general-purpose bomb
    - FAB-250 UMPK gliding bomb
    - FAB-500 UMPK gliding bomb
    - FAB-1500 UMPK gliding bomb
    - FAB-3000 UMPK gliding bomb
    - 2 × BETAB-500SHP
    - P-50T bomb
    - ODAB-500PM bomb
    - RBK-500 cluster bomb
    - SPBE-D bomb
    - UMPB D-30SN glide bomb

Avionics

- V004 passive electronically scanned array radar
- Khibiny electronic countermeasures system
- SAP-14 electronic coutermeasures system
- SAP-518 electronic coutermeasures system
- UKR-RT SIGINT radio surveillance system
- L150 Pastel radar warning receiver

== See also ==
Related development

- Sukhoi Su-27
- Sukhoi Su-30
- Sukhoi Su-33
- Sukhoi Su-35
- Sukhoi Su-37

Aircraft of comparable role, configuration, and era

- Sukhoi Su-24
- Boeing F/A-18E/F Super Hornet
- McDonnell Douglas F-15E Strike Eagle
- Shenyang J-16
- Xi'an JH-7
- General Dynamics F-111, FB-111
