= USS Donald Cook =

Arleigh Burke-class destroyer

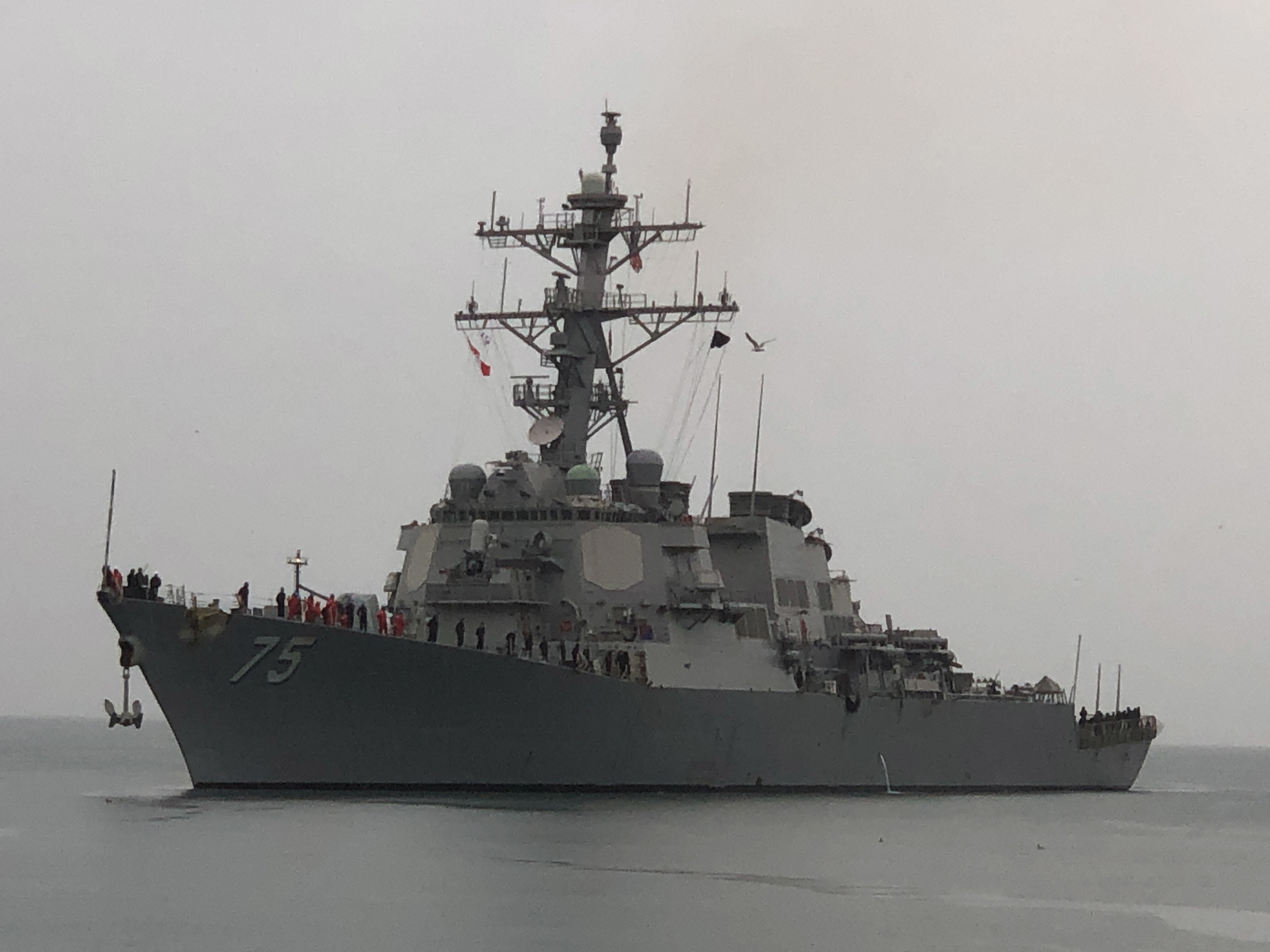
- USS Donald Cook (DDG-75) on 5 Feb 2021

History

United States
- Name: Donald Cook
- Namesake: Donald Cook
- Ordered: 19 January 1993
- Builder: Bath Iron Works
- Laid down: 9 July 1996
- Launched: 3 May 1997
- Acquired: 21 August 1998
- Commissioned: 4 December 1998
- Home port: Mayport
- Identification: MMSI number: 368895000; Callsign: NDGC; Hull number: DDG-75
- Motto: Faith Without Fear
- Status: in active service
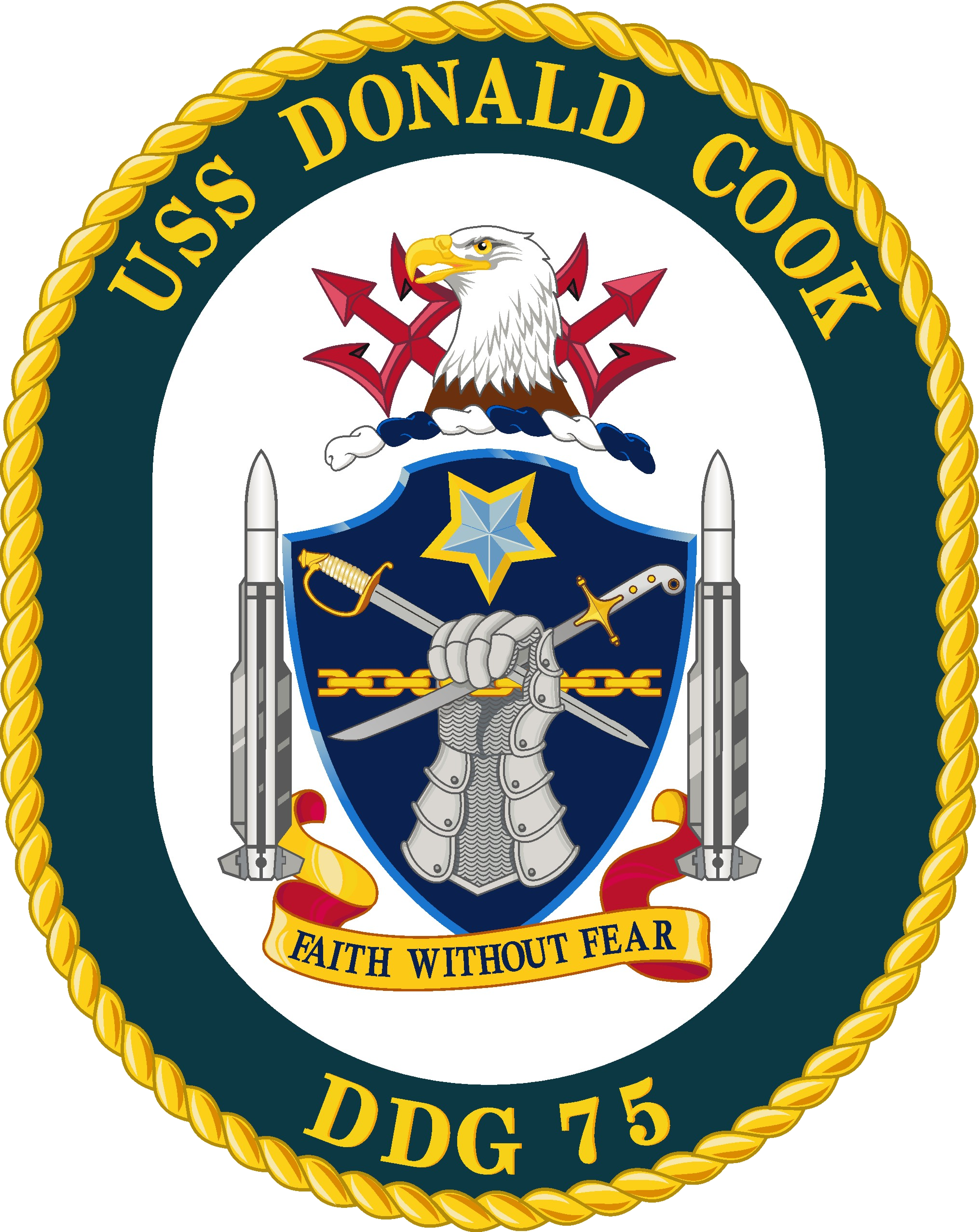
- Badge

General characteristics
- Class & type: Arleigh Burke-class destroyer
- Displacement: 8,637 long tons (8,776 t) (Full load)
- Length: 505 ft (154 m)
- Beam: 59 ft (18 m)
- Draft: 31 ft (9.4 m)
- Installed power: 4 × General Electric LM2500-30 gas turbines; 100,000 shp (75,000 kW)
- Propulsion: 2 × shafts
- Speed: In excess of 30 kn (56 km/h; 35 mph)
- Range: 4,400 nmi (8,100 km; 5,100 mi) at 20 kn (37 km/h; 23 mph)
- Complement: 33 commissioned officers; 38 chief petty officers; 210 enlisted personnel
- Sensors & processing systems: AN/SPY-1D PESA 3D radar (Flight I, II, IIA); AN/SPY-6(V)1 AESA 3D radar (Flight III); AN/SPS-67(V)3 or (V)5 surface search radar (DDG-51 – DDG-118); AN/SPQ-9B surface search radar (DDG-119 onward); AN/SPS-73(V)12 surface search/navigation radar (DDG-51 – DDG-86); BridgeMaster E surface search/navigation radar (DDG-87 onward); 3 × AN/SPG-62 fire-control radar; Mk 46 optical sight system (Flight I, II, IIA); Mk 20 electro-optical sight system (Flight III); AN/SQQ-89 ASW combat system: AN/SQS-53C sonar array; AN/SQR-19 tactical towed array sonar (Flight I, II, IIA); TB-37U multi-function towed array sonar (DDG-113 onward); AN/SQQ-28 LAMPS III shipboard system
- Electronic warfare & decoys: AN/SLQ-32 electronic warfare suite; AN/SLQ-25 Nixie torpedo countermeasures; Mk 36 Mod 12 decoy launching systems; Mk 53 Nulka decoy launching systems; Mk 59 decoy launching systems
- Armament: Guns: 1 × 5-inch (127 mm)/54 mk 45 mod 1/2 (lightweight gun); 1 × 20 mm (0.8 in) Phalanx CIWS; 2 × 25 mm (0.98 in) Mk 38 machine gun system; 4 × 0.50 inches (12.7 mm) caliber guns; Missiles: 2 × Mk 141 Harpoon anti-ship missile launcher; 1 × SeaRAM CIWS; 1 × 29-cell, 1 × 61-cell (90 total cells) Mk 41 vertical launching system (VLS): RIM-66M surface-to-air missile; RIM-156 surface-to-air missile; RIM-161 anti-ballistic missile; BGM-109 Tomahawk cruise missile; RUM-139 vertical launch ASROC; Torpedoes: 2 × Mark 32 triple torpedo tubes: Mark 46 lightweight torpedo; Mark 50 lightweight torpedo; Mark 54 lightweight torpedo
- Aircraft carried: 1 × Sikorsky MH-60R

USS Donald Cook (DDG-75) is an Arleigh Burke-class (Flight II) Aegis guided missile destroyer in the United States Navy named for Medal of Honor recipient Donald Cook, a colonel in the United States Marine Corps. She is the 14th of the class to be built at Bath Iron Works in Bath, Maine. Construction began on 9 July 1996, she was launched and christened on 3 May 1997, and on 4 December 1998, she was commissioned at Penn's Landing Pier in Philadelphia, Pennsylvania.

On 16 February 2012, Secretary of the Navy Ray Mabus announced Donald Cook was to be one of four ships to be homeported at Naval Station Rota, Spain. In January 2014, the Navy announced that the ship would arrive there in mid-February 2014. In Rota she forms part of Destroyer Squadron 60.

== Upgrade ==
On 12 November 2009, the Missile Defense Agency announced that Donald Cook would be upgraded during fiscal 2012 to RIM-161 Standard Missile 3 (SM-3) capability to function as part of the Aegis Ballistic Missile Defense System.

In 2016, four destroyers patrolling with the U.S. 6th Fleet based in Naval Station Rota, Spain, including Donald Cook received self-protection upgrades, replacing the aft Phalanx CIWS 20 mm Vulcan cannon with the SeaRAM 11-cell RIM-116 Rolling Airframe Missile launcher. The SeaRam uses the same sensor dome as the Phalanx. This was the first time the close-range ship defense system was paired with an Aegis ship. All four ships to receive the upgrade were either Flight I or II, meaning they originally had two Phalanx CIWS systems when launched.

== Service history ==
=== 2010s ===
On 24 February 2012, Donald Cook was awarded the 2011 Battle Efficiency "E" award. On 9 April 2014, U.S. military officials confirmed the deployment of Donald Cook to the Black Sea, shortly after Russia's annexation of Crimea and amid the pro-Russian unrest in Ukraine. The U.S. Department of Defense's official statement said that the vessel's mission was "to reassure NATO allies and Black Sea partners of America’s commitment to strengthen and improve interoperability, while working towards mutual goals in the region". On 10 April 2014, the warship was reported to have entered the Black Sea. On 12 April 2014, an unarmed Russian Su-24 "Fencer" strike aircraft made 12 close-range passes of Donald Cook during a patrol of the western Black Sea. According to an allegation by a Pentagon spokesman, "The aircraft did not respond to multiple queries and warnings from Donald Cook, and the event ended without incident after approximately 90 minutes." Further, Donald Cook is more than capable of defending herself against a pair of Su-24s. In 2014, Russia's state-run news-media outlets ran a series of reports that falsely asserted that during that incident, the Su-24, equipped with the Khibiny electronic warfare system, had disabled the ship's Aegis combat systems. The misinformation was later picked up by British tabloid The Sun and by Fox News, and later reported as Russian propaganda by The New York Times.

On 14 April 2014, Donald Cook visited Constanta, Romania, where President Traian Băsescu had a tour of the ship. Donald Cook then conducted various exercises in concert with the Romanian Navy before departing the Black Sea on 24 April 2014. On 26 December 2014, for the second time, according to the U.S. Navy, the destroyer entered the Black Sea to reassure and demonstrate U.S. commitment to work closely with NATO allies. Donald Cook participated in exercises with the Turkish Navy, including an underway replenishment and other exercises with the Yavuz-class frigate TCG Fatih on 28 December 2014. The ship visited Constanta, Romania, on 30 December and Varna, Bulgaria, on 8 January 2015. She also participated in exercises with Ukrainian Navy ship Hetman Sahaydachniy on 11 January 2015, and then departed the Black Sea on 14 January 2015.

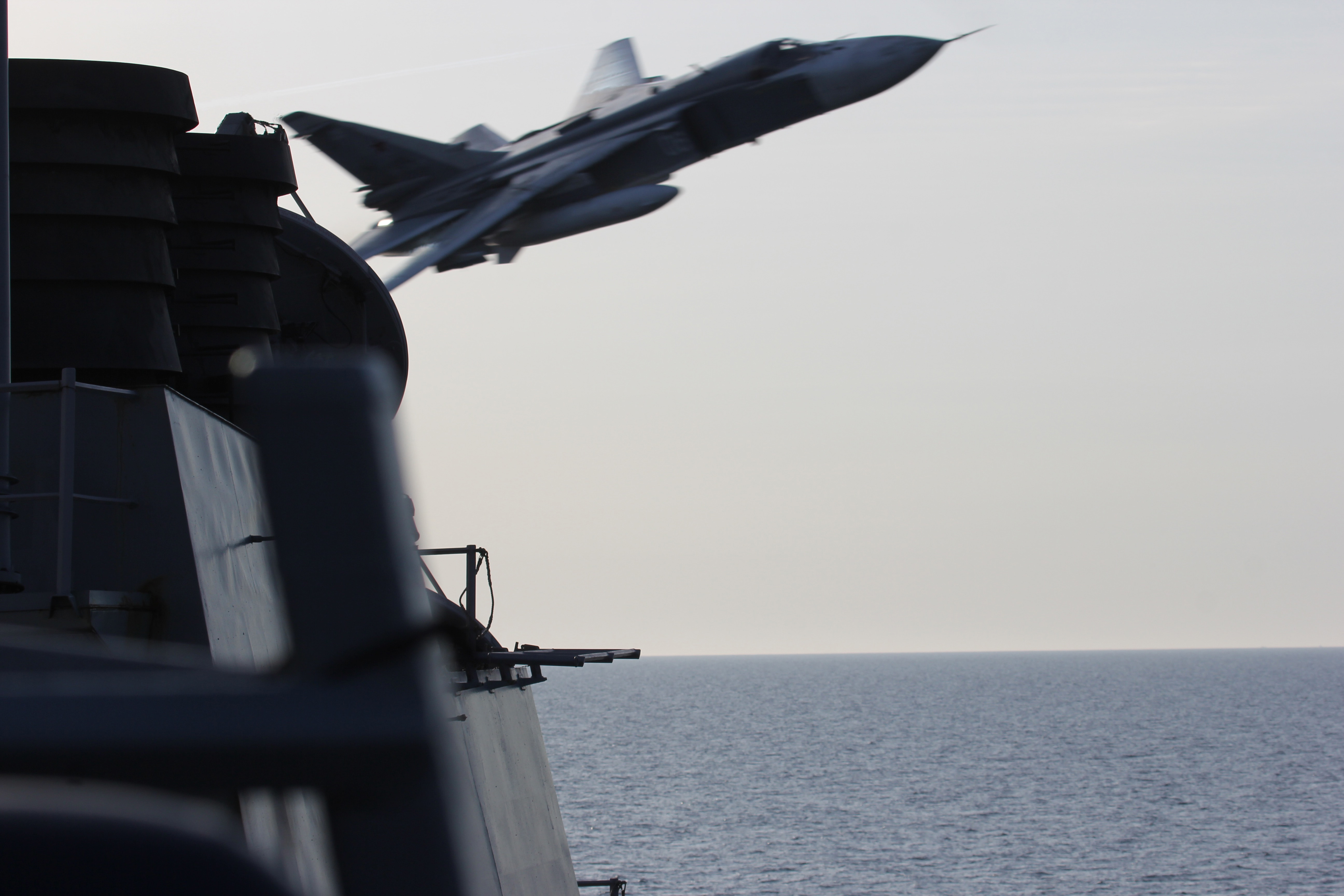
A Russian Sukhoi Su-24 attack aircraft makes a very-low-altitude pass by USS Donald Cook on 12 April 2016.

Video released by the US Navy of the encounter with the Sukhoi Su-24

On 11 and 12 April 2016, two Russian Su-24s performed several low-altitude passes on Donald Cook while the ship was conducting exercises with a Polish helicopter in international waters in the Baltic Sea, 70 nautical miles (130 km; 81 mi) off Kaliningrad. A Russian Ka-27 "Helix" antisubmarine helicopter also circled the destroyer seven times. The U.S. Navy released photos and videos of the incident on 14 April, and the U.S. government lodged a complaint with the Russian government. In response to the U.S. Secretary of State commenting on the incident and saying that "under the rules of engagement, that could have been a shoot-down", the Russian Federation Council's official Igor Morozov said that the U.S. likewise "ought to know that Donald Cook approached our borders and may already be unable to depart those." On 26 February 2019, the ship hosted U.S. diplomats Gordon Sondland, Marie Yovanovitch, Kurt Volker, the EU's Jean Christophe-Belliard, and Ukrainian President Petro Poroshenko, among others.

=== 2020s ===
On 23 February 2020, the ship entered the Black Sea, marking the seventh time a U.S. ship had entered the sea in 2020. While in the Black Sea, the ship conducted routine maritime security operations. USS Arleigh Burke (DDG-51) departed Naval Station Norfolk on 26 March, to replace Donald Cook as one of the forward destroyers located in Rota, Spain. Donald Cook's new homeport was to be Naval Station Mayport.

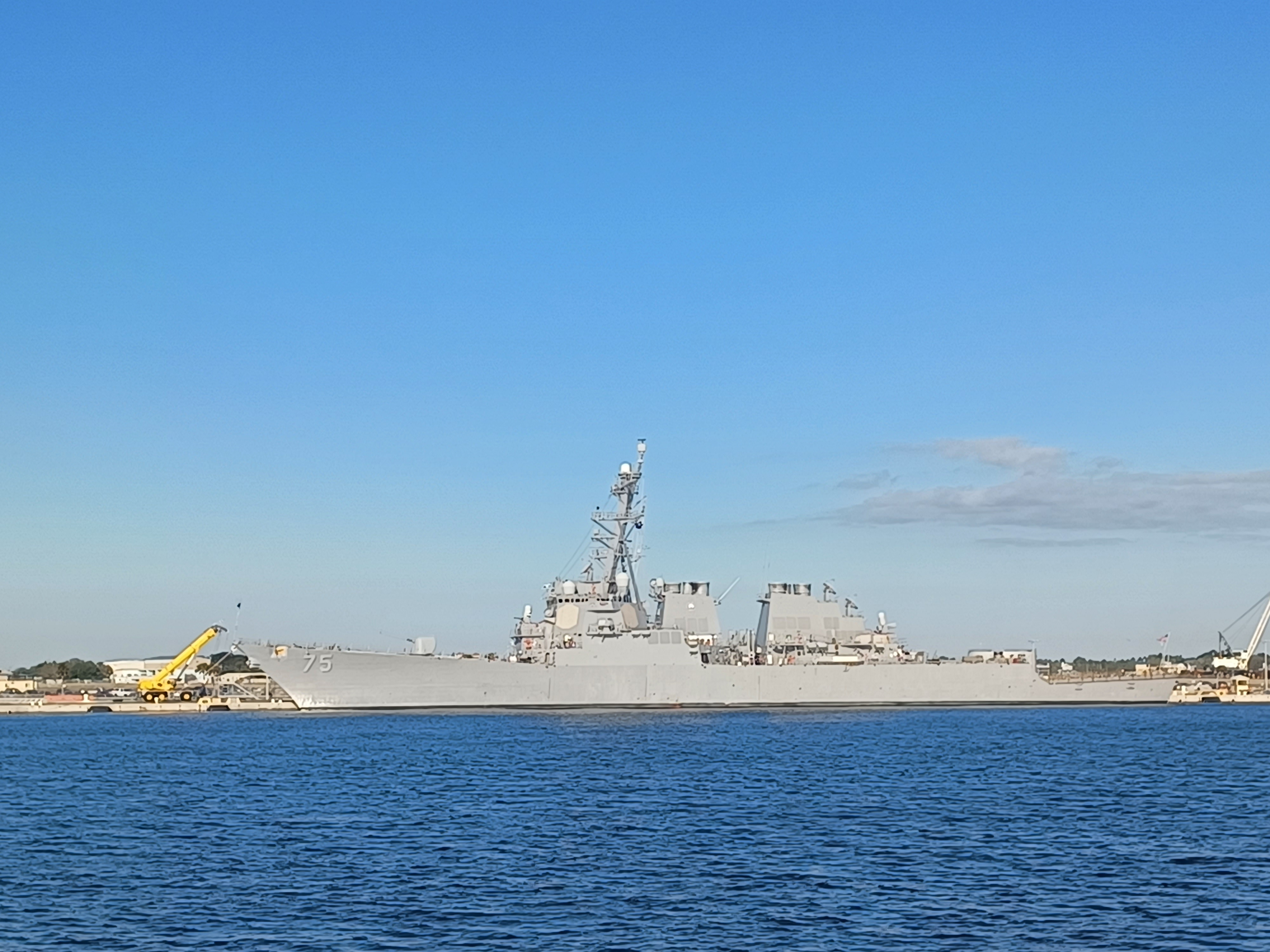
Homeport at Mayport Naval Station in Jacksonville, Florida

On 25 April 2022, the ship returned to Mayport after a three-month deployment.

On 12 June 2024, USS Donald Cook along with USS Truxtun, USS Delbert D. Black, Coast Guard cutter Stone, and a Boeing P-8 maritime patrol aircraft were deployed to track a Russian naval flotilla sailing less than 30 miles off the coast of Key Largo, Florida. The flotilla was expected to arrive the same day in Havana, Cuba for naval and air exercises.

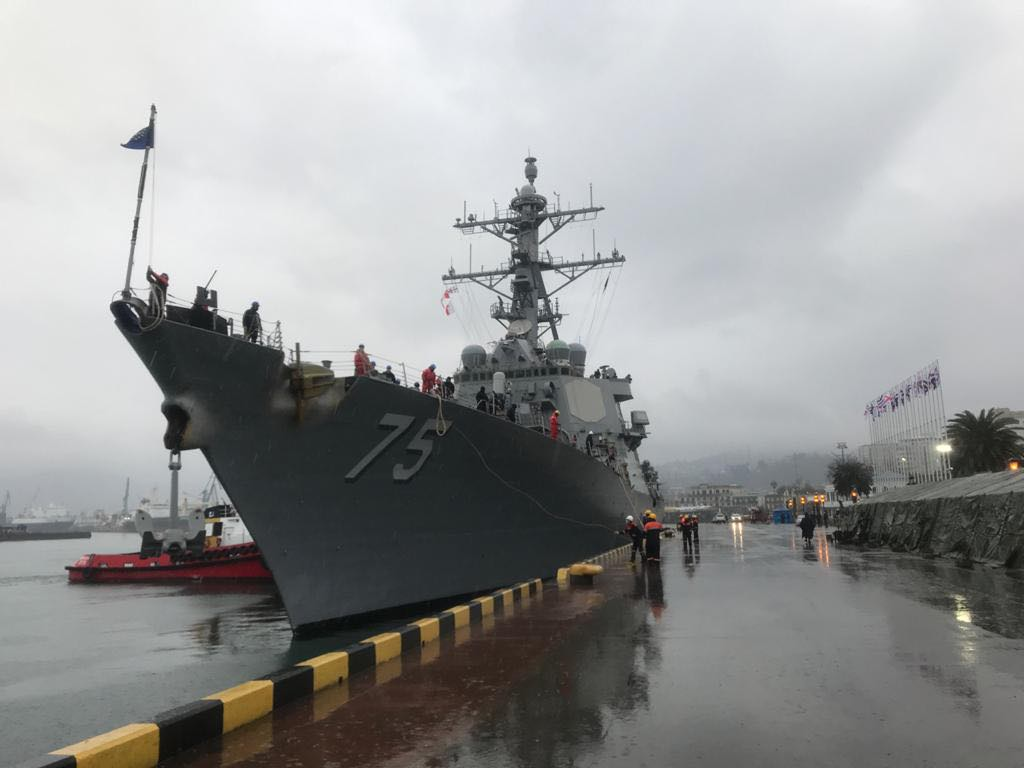
Donald Cook in Batumi, Georgia, February 2021.

== Coat of arms ==
=== Shield ===
The shield has background of dark blue with a light-blue trim. A reversed star hangs above a gauntlet hoisting a broken chain and crossing sword. Missiles surround the shield.

The traditional Navy colors were chosen for the shield because dark blue and gold represent the sea and excellence, respectively. Red is also included to signify valor and sacrifice. The armoured gauntlet holding a broken chain represents Colonel Cook's gallantry and indomitable spirit in captivity as a prisoner of war to the Viet Cong. He put the interests of his comrades before his own life. The crossed swords denote spirit and teamwork, as well as U.S. Navy and Marine Corps heritage. The U.S. Marine Corps officers' Mameluke sword is representative of Colonel Cook's Marine service. The light-blue upside-down star symbolizes the Medal of Honor Cook earned for his spirit, sacrifice, and heroism.

=== Crest ===
The crest consists of an eagle surrounded by red tridents.

The eagle symbolizes the principles of freedom on which the United States was founded, as well as military vigilance and national defense. The tridents represent sea power and the ship's Aegis firepower and ability to conduct operations in multi-threat environments

— United States Navy,

=== Motto ===
The motto is written on a scroll of gold that has a red reverse side.

The ships motto is "Faith without Fear". The motto is a reference to both the honorable feats of Colonel Cook and the Medal of Honor he received.

=== Seal ===
The coat of arms in full color as in the blazon, upon a white background enclosed within a dark blue oval border edged on the outside with a gold rope and bearing the inscription "USS DONALD COOK" at the top and "DDG 75" in the base all gold.
