= Donald Cook (Medal of Honor) =

United States Medal of Honor recipient

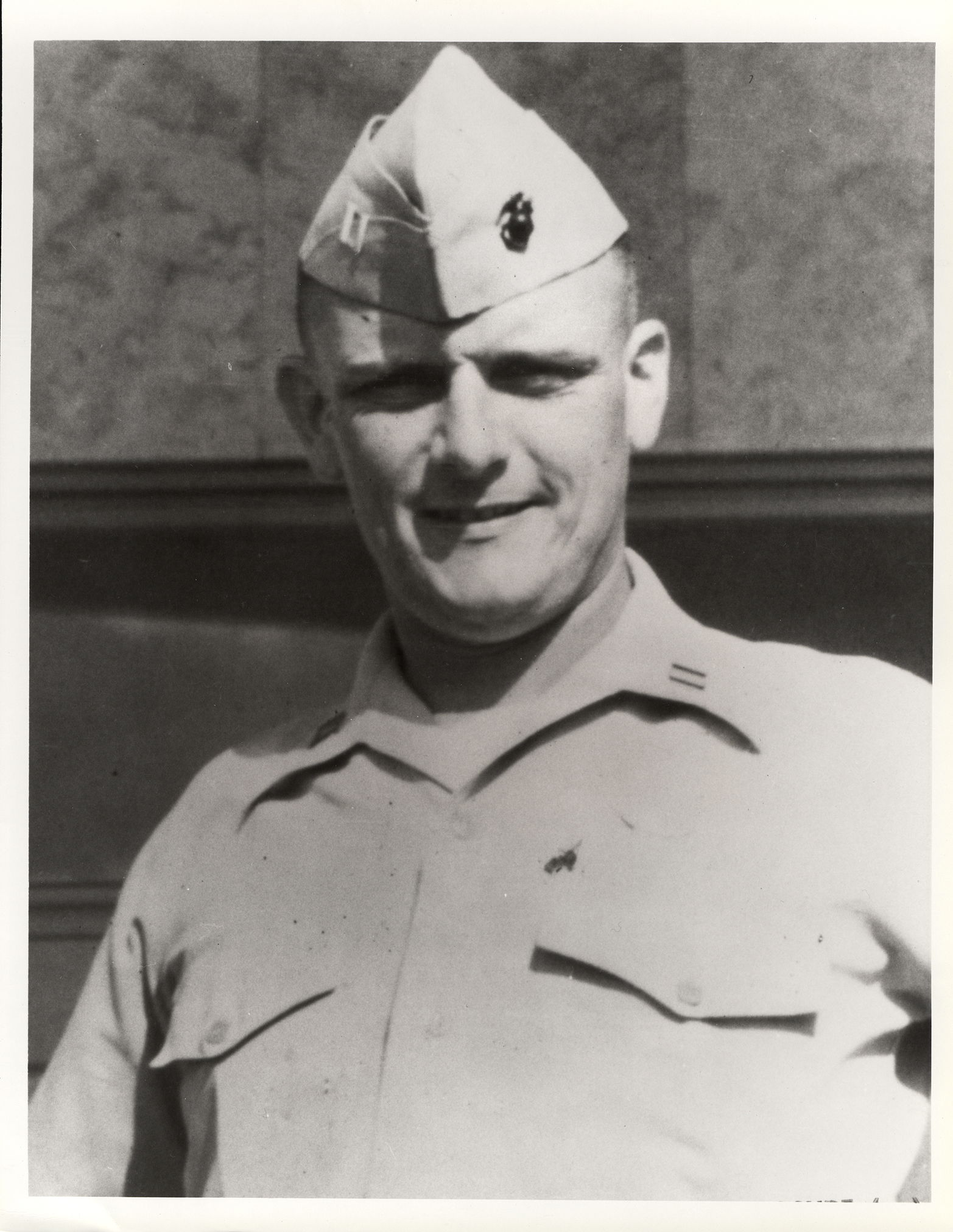
- Born: August 9, 1934; Brooklyn, New York, U.S.
- Died: December 8, 1967 (aged 33); Republic of Vietnam
- Burial place: Remains never recovered; memorial headstone in Arlington National Cemetery, Arlington, Virginia
- Military career
- Allegiance: United States
- Branch: United States Marine Corps
- Service years: 1956–1967
- Rank: Colonel (posthumous)
- Units: 3rd Marine Division; MACV
- Conflicts: Vietnam War
- Awards: Medal of Honor; Purple Heart (2)

Donald Gilbert Cook (August 9, 1934 – December 8, 1967) was a United States Marine Corps officer and a Medal of Honor recipient.

== Biography ==
Donald Cook was born in Brooklyn, New York. He attended Xavier High School in New York City and St. Michael's College in Vermont.

In 1956, Cook enlisted in the Marine Corps as a private but was quickly sent for officer training at the Officer Candidates School in Quantico, Virginia. He was commissioned a second lieutenant in 1957. Three years later, Cook attended Army Language School in Monterey, California, studying Chinese and graduated near the top of his class. Cook was assigned to Camp H.M. Smith, Hawaii, in 1961 and was promoted to captain on March 1, 1962. He held a series of assignments in the Marine Corps and was sent to South Vietnam in late 1964, serving as an advisor to the Vietnamese Marine Division until he was wounded and captured by the Viet Cong several weeks later. Cook was held as a prisoner of war by the Viet Cong from December 31, 1964, until his death from malaria at age 33 on December 8, 1967, and was buried in the U Minh forest swamp by his fellow prisoners.

Cook's remains have never been recovered from the swamp and are now lost. An official memorial stone (cenotaph) can be found in Arlington National Cemetery, Arlington, Virginia, Memorial Section MI Lot 110. He was posthumously promoted from captain to colonel. On February 26, 1980, Cook was officially declared dead, and the Medal of Honor was presented to his wife by the Secretary of the Navy.

== Decorations ==

	Medal of Honor	
Purple Heart with one gold star	Combat Action Ribbon	National Defense Service Medal
Armed Forces Expeditionary Medal	Vietnam Service Medal	Vietnam Campaign Medal

== Medal of Honor citation ==
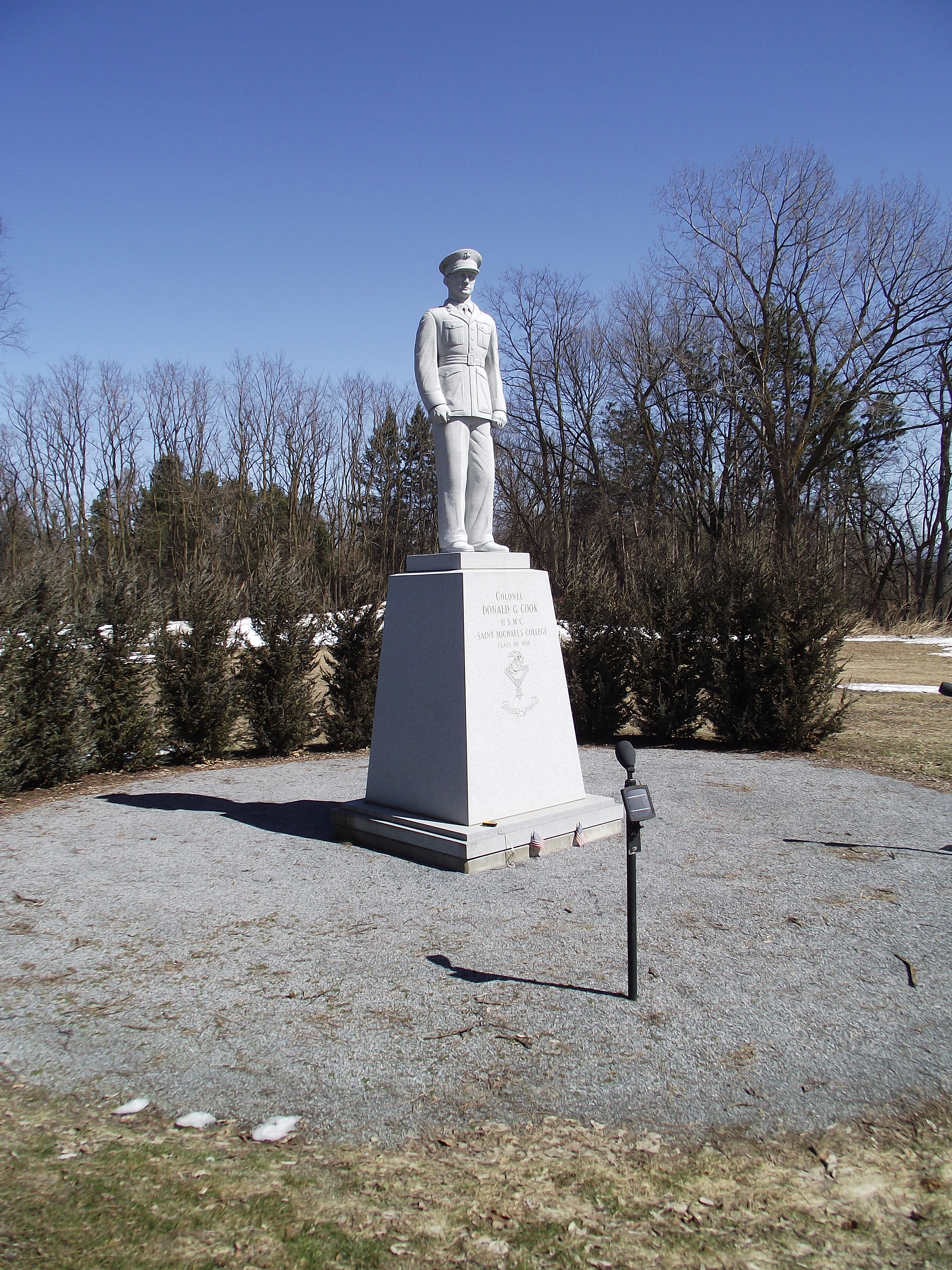
Statue of Col. Cook on the campus of St. Michael's College in Colchester, Vermont

Citation for award of Medal of Honor:

For conspicuous gallantry and intrepidity at the risk of his life above and beyond the call of duty while interned as a Prisoner of War by the Viet Cong in the Republic of Vietnam during the period 31 December 1964 to 8 December 1967. Despite the fact that by so doing he would bring about harsher treatment for himself, Colonel (then Captain) Cook established himself as the senior prisoner, even though in actuality he was not. Repeatedly assuming more than his share of responsibility for their health, Colonel Cook willingly and unselfishly put the interests of his comrades before that of his own well-being and, eventually, his life. Giving more needy men his medicine and drug allowance while constantly nursing them, he risked infection from contagious diseases while in a rapidly deteriorating state of health. This unselfish and exemplary conduct, coupled with his refusal to stray even the slightest from the Code of Conduct, earned him the deepest respect from not only his fellow prisoners, but his captors as well. Rather than negotiate for his own release or better treatment, he steadfastly frustrated attempts by the Viet Cong to break his indomitable spirit and passed this same resolve on to the men whose well-being he so closely associated himself. Knowing his refusals would prevent his release prior to the end of the war, and also knowing his chances for prolonged survival would be small in the event of continued refusal, he chose nevertheless to adhere to a Code of Conduct far above that which could be expected. His personal valor and exceptional spirit of loyalty in the face of almost certain death reflected the highest credit upon Colonel Cook, the Marine Corps, and the United States Naval Service.

== Legacy ==
The United States Navy Arleigh Burke-class guided missile destroyer USS Donald Cook (DDG-75) is named in his honor.

Cook Hall at the Defense Language Institute Foreign Language Center, Presidio of Monterey, in Monterey, California, is named after Cook, who graduated from the school's Chinese Mandarin course in May 1961. Cook Hall was dedicated in late 2014 and is the largest and most modern academic building of the DLIFLC campus.

Cook is honored with a 'Freedom Tree' on the Vermont State House lawn.

Colonel Donald G. Cook Chapter 5 Disabled American Veterans (DAV) of Burlington, Vermont is named in his honor. Col. Donald G. Cook Chapter 5 DAV assists veterans in obtaining compensation for their service-connected disabilities, raises funds to support the DAV travel service for disabled veterans to the White River Junction, Vermont Veterans Hospital, and generally serves the needs of disabled Veterans in Burlington and the surrounding areas.

Saint Michael's College bestows the Colonel Donald G. Cook '56 Award to alumni for unselfish service to others. It is the College's most prestigious alumni award.

The Colonel Donald G. Cook award is presented to a United States Marine Corps active duty (officer or enlisted) or Government Civilian intelligence professional to recognize professional excellence and exceptional dedication to duty in Marine Corps Intelligence. Annually presented, the award is sponsored by the National Military Intelligence Association (NMIA).

== See also ==
- List of Medal of Honor recipients
- List of Medal of Honor recipients for the Vietnam War

== Notes ==
=== References ===
- "Colonel Donald G. Cook, USMC". Who's Who in Marine Corps History. History Division, United States Marine Corps.
- "Medal of Honor – Col. Donald G. Cook (Medal of Honor citation)". Marines Awarded the Medal of Honor. Archived from the original on 2007-03-05.
- Service Profile
