= Khibiny (electronic countermeasures system) =

Soviet/Russian radio-electronic jamming system

Khibiny (L-175V) (Хибины) (Л-175В) is a Soviet / Russian aircraft electronic countermeasures (ECM) system. The name refers to Khibiny Mountains.

The system is designed for radio direction-finding and probing signal source irradiation allowing it to distort reflected signal parameters. This helps to

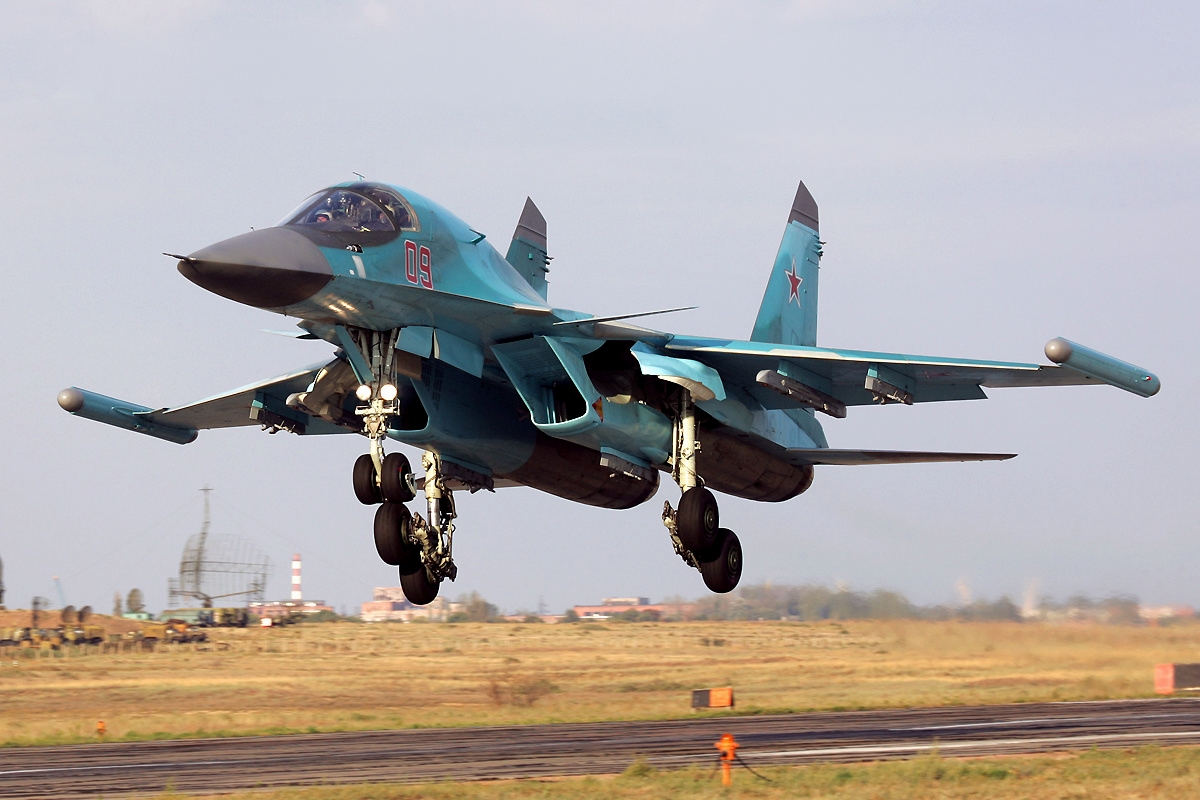
Su-34 with ECM modules "Khibiny" on the wing tips

- Delay aircraft detection;
- Mask the true subject against false reflections;
- Cause range finding difficulties, namely in speed and angular positions;
- Degrading Maintenance Mode TWS when scanning antenna beam radar;
- Increase the time and difficulty of capturing an object during real-time active scanning;
- Create "false electronic situation", meaning to create electronic "clones".

== History ==
The first work related to the creation ECM "Khibiny" began in the Kaluga Research Institute of Radio Engineering; (Russian: Калужский научно-исследовательский радиотехнический институт) (КНИРТИ)) in 1977. The plan was to create a unified set of electronic countermeasures for all the armed forces, where the tasks for KNIRTI was to develop SIGINT blocks of equipment "Proran" and radio jammer (RJ) "Regatta", which was successfully completed with protected of scientific research in 1980.

In 1982 KNIRTI was entrusted with research and development activities, first with "Proran" and "Regatta", and after an ECM as a whole, which includes many developments on related topics (including the use of accumulated experience in the development of RJ " Sorption ", which was planned to be installed on the Su-27 ). When started research and development with new ECM, later named "Khibiny", it was intended to unite all the units, ensuring that they work closely with the Jets avionics.

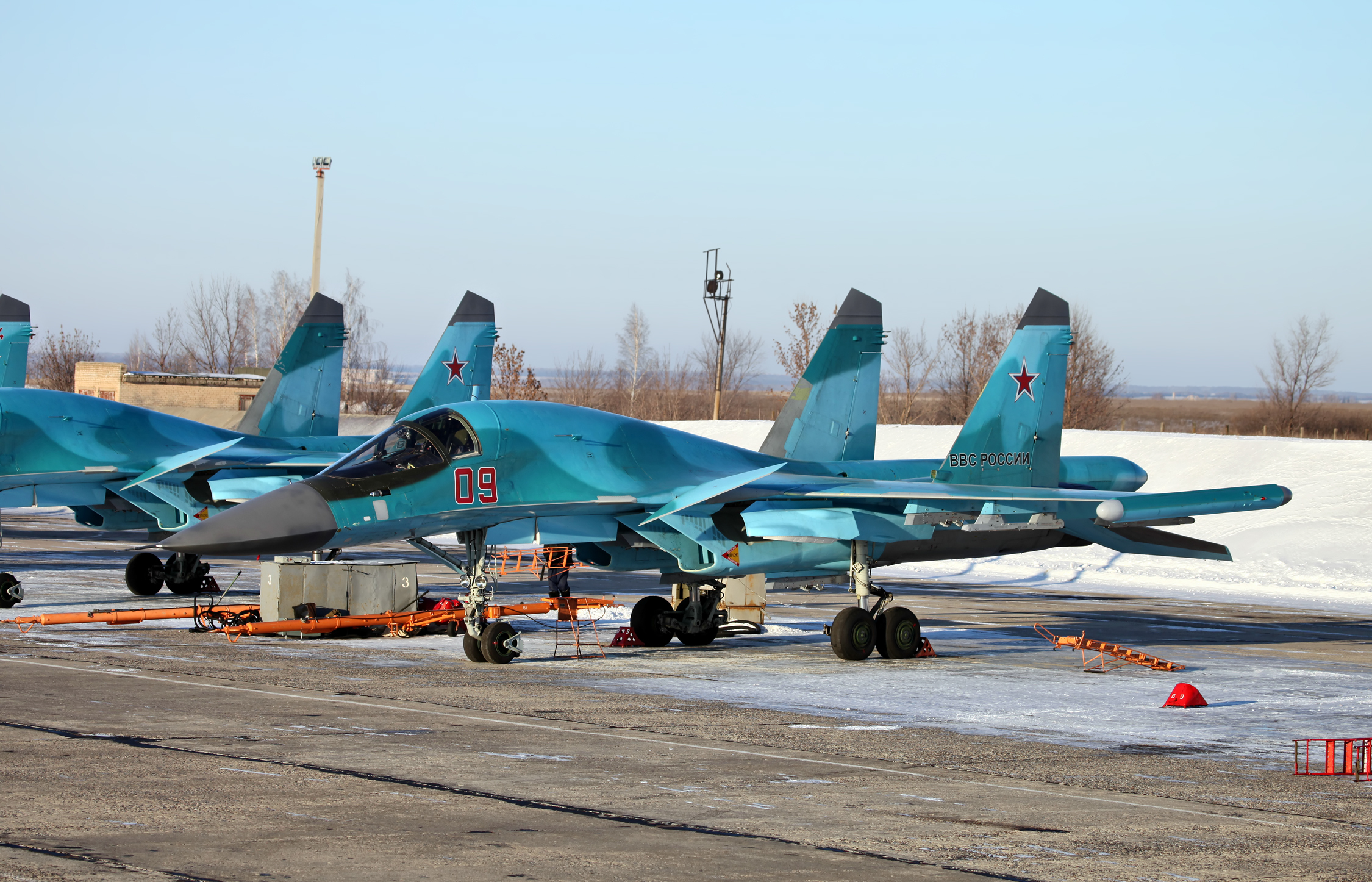
SAP-518 wing tip module on Su-34

The first samples of "Khibiny" were far from ideal since their weight and size parameters weren't suitable for installation on the Su-27M. To solve this problem KNIRTI collaborated closely with Sukhoi, working under the direction of Rollan G. Martirosov. Collaborate on a plane integrated ECM (received code "product L-175") bore little resemblance to the conventional practice in such cases. Typically, the manufacturer of equipment issues to aircraft design bureau specification for the placement of products that represent a complete set of design documents and makes recommendations on placement of its parts with the restrictions on the length of the connections between them. In this case, the equipment "Khibiny" was immediately inserted into the design of the aircraft under development. Consequent to close co-operation by the end of the 1980s the first stage of R&D was completed and prototypes were made, due to delayed development the L-005S Sorbitsya-S was made as an offshoot, like the Khibiny it also used an AESA horn antenna for ECM transmission (although the big difference between the three was that Khibiny used digital signal processing whilst Sorbitsya used analogue). March 18, 2014 was adopted the fighter-bomber Su-34, equipped with electronic countermeasures complex L-175V "Khibiny". Upgraded Khibiny EW complexes join air units in course of modernization. According to TASS, the "Khibiny" complex will be further modernized based on combat results of Su-34 front-line bombers during their combat deployment in the Russian invasion of Ukraine.

Features of the ECM system include.

- False target generator
- Track breakers
- Frequency agility countermeasures
- Global navigation spoofing
- DRFM

The SAP-518 or SAP-14 active jamming pods (or using the N035 Irbis antenna as part of Khibiny-M) have various jamming options available.

- Sweep jamming
- Pulse jamming
- Continuous wave jamming
- Power managed jamming
- Noise jamming

Also in 2014 when a Russian jet flew over USS Donald Cook, it created fake electronic signatures of additional targets.

The current model is the Khibiny-M which utilises GaN based AESA antennas for ECM transmission.

On 12 September 2022, Ukrainian forces claimed to have recovered a RTU 518-PSM jamming pod which is a part of the Khibiny-U system. It was found in the wreckage of the Su-30M near Izyum. The Khibiny-U system had been designed for the SU-30SM.

== Variants ==
- L-175 Khibiny used on Su-27M, Su-30 and Su-32.
- L-175V Khibiny-10V used on Su-34.
- L-175U Khibiny-U used on Su-30SM.
- L-265M10 Khibiny-M used on Su-30SM2, Su-34M and Su-35S.
