= JSC Kuznetsov =

Subsidiary of United Engine Corporation

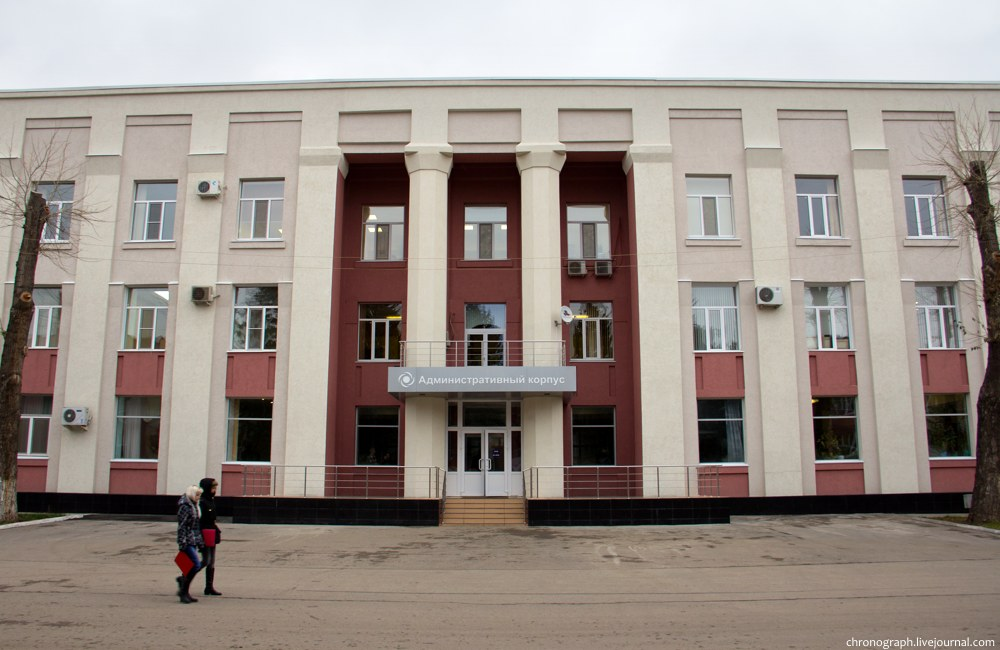
- Company type: Joint-stock company
- Industry: Engineering
- Founded: 1912; 114 years ago
- Headquarters: Samara, Russia
- Products: Aircraft engines, rocket engines, turbines
- Revenue: $141 million (2016)
- Operating income: $1.94 million (2016)
- Net income: −$28.9 million (2016)
- Total assets: $367 million (2016)
- Total equity: −$15.1 million (2016)
- Parent: United Engine Corporation
- Website: kuznetsov-motors.ru

JSC Kuznetsov (Russian: ПАО «Кузнецов») is one of the leading Russian producers of aircraft engines, liquid-propellant rocket engines as well as aeroderivative gas turbines and modular stations.

The current joint-stock company was established through the consolidation of several Samara-based aerospace engine companies, including JSC N.D. Kuznetsov SNTK, JSC Samara Design Bureau of Machine Building and JSC NPO Povolzhskiy AviTI.

== History ==
The company was established in 1912 as the Gnome Factory of Moscow, after the French aircraft engine company Gnome et Rhône which supplied the engine parts assembled by the plant. In 1925 it was renamed 'Frunze Factory No. 24', after Bolshevik leader Mikhail Frunze. The factory was evacuated to its current location in Samara in 1941.

The Samara Frunze Engine-Building Production Association was one of the principal aerospace engine production complexes in Russia, with six plants and 25,000 employees in the early 1990s. It has produced turbojet and turboprop engines for military and civil use, including Blackjack and Backfire bombers and Tu-154 transports. The NK-12M engine produced by Frunze is the most powerful turboprop in the world. Samara Frunze also produced engines for the Salyut spacecraft and for the Mir space station.

Re-established as the joint-stock company Motorostroitel in 1994, it retained this denomination until 2010, when it was merged with several other Samara-based engine plants on the verge of bankruptcy. It then took the name of one of new its subsidiaries, Kuznetsov Design Bureau.

== Products ==
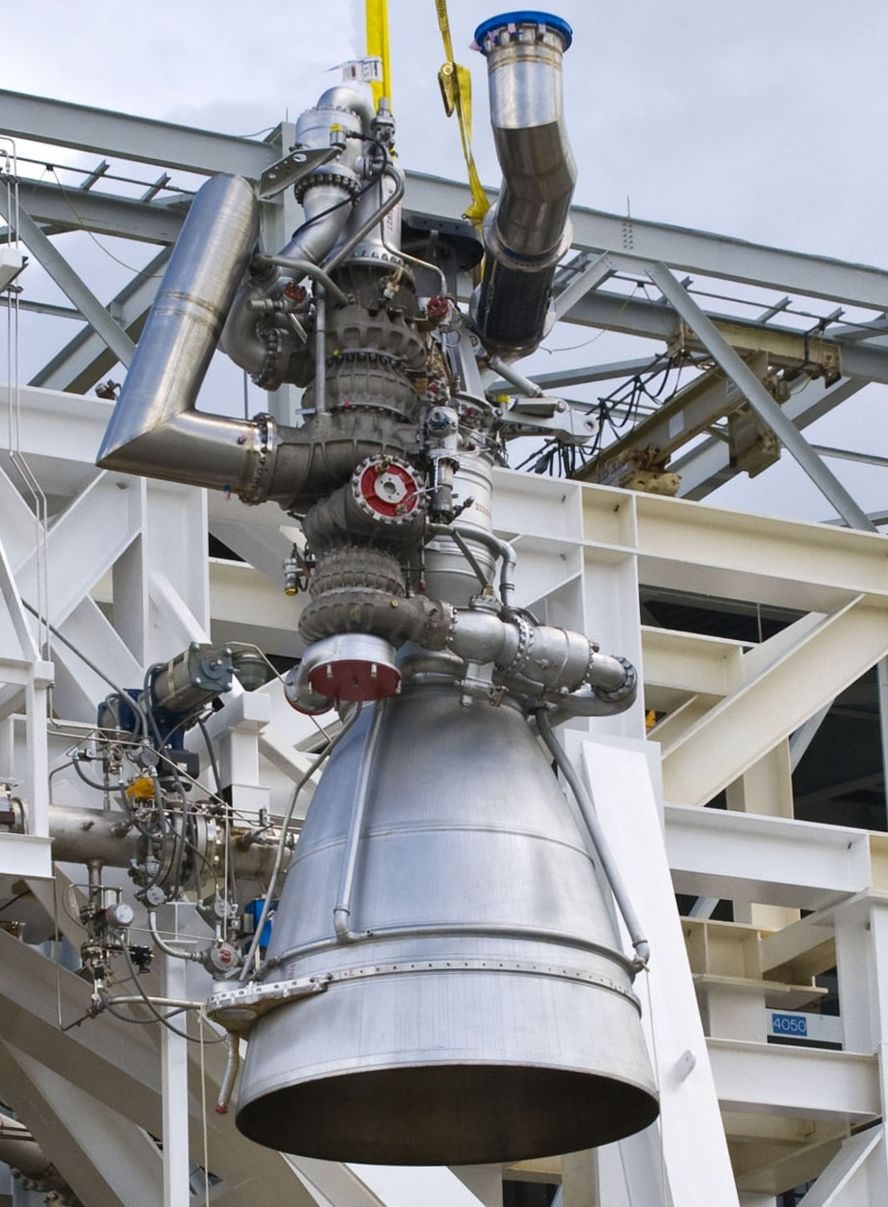
NK-33

The current production range of JSC Kuznetsov includes the NK-33 rocket engine, the Kuznetsov NK-32 aviation engine and the NK-37ST industrial engine. In 2016 the company announced plans to produce a modernized version of its NK-32 engine by the end of the year.

=== Aircraft engines ===
The Kuznetzov Bureau first became notable for producing the monstrous Kuznetsov NK-12 turboprop engine that powered the Tupolev Tu-95 bomber beginning in 1952 as a development of the Junkers 0022 engine. The new engine eventually generated about 15,000 horsepower (11.2 megawatts), far more than any Western turboprop engine of its time, and it was also used in the large Antonov An-22 Soviet Air Force transport.

Kuznetsov also produced the Kuznetsov NK-8 turbofan engine in the 90 kN (20,000 lb_{f}) class that powered the Ilyushin Il-62 and Tupolev Tu-154 airliners. This engine was next upgraded to become the about 125 kN (28,000 lb_{f}) Kuznetsov NK-86 engine that powered the Ilyushin Il-86 aircraft. This Bureau also produced the Kuznetsov NK-144 afterburning turbofan engine. This engine powered the early models of the Tupolev Tu-144 SST.

The Kuznetsov Design Bureau also produced the Kuznetsov NK-87 turbofan engine that was used on the Lun-class ekranoplan. (Only one such aircraft has ever been produced.)

Kuznetsov's most powerful aviation engine is the Kuznetsov NK-321 that propels the Tupolev Tu-160 bomber and was formerly used in the later models of the Tu-144 supersonic transport (an SST that is now obsolete and no longer flown). The NK-321 produced a maximum of about 245 kN (55,000 lb_{f}) of thrust.

Kuznetsov aircraft engines include:

- Kuznetsov RD-20 turbojet. Licensed production of the BMW 003. Powered the Mikoyan-Gurevich MiG-9.
- Kuznetsov TV-022 turboprop (TurboVintovy TV12 TreibWerk TW 12) Reproduction of the Junkers Jumo 022 .
- Kuznetsov TV-2 turboprop.
- Kuznetsov NK-4 turboprop. Powered the early Antonov An-10 and Ilyushin Il-18.
- Kuznetsov NK-6 afterburning turbofan. Powered the Tupolev Tu-95LL and was considered for the Tupolev Tu-22 and Tupolev Tu-123, but this never happened.
- Kuznetsov NK-8 turbofan. Powers the original Ilyushin Il-62, A-90 Orlyonok ekranoplan and the Tupolev Tu-154A and B models.
- Kuznetsov NK-12 contra rotating turboprop. Powers all the versions of the Tupolev Tu-95, Tupolev Tu-114, Tupolev Tu-126, Antonov An-22 and the A-90 Orlyonok ekranoplan. Initially designated as TV-12, but was renamed to NK-12 in honor of the company's founder, Nikolai Kuznetsov.
- Kuznetsov NK-14 nuclear-powered engine. Powered the inboard engine of the prototype Tupolev Tu-119 nuclear-powered aircraft; a modified version of the Tupolev Tu-95.
- Kuznetsov NK-16 turboprop. Was to power the Tupolev Tu-96.
- Kuznetsov NK-22 afterburning turbofan. Powered the Tupolev Tu-22M0, M1 and M2.
- Kuznetsov NK-25 afterburning turbofan. Developed from the NK-22; powers the Tupolev Tu-22M3.
- Kuznetsov NK-26 turboprop. Intended for ekranoplans.
- Kuznetsov NK-32 afterburning turbofan. Powers the Tupolev Tu-160 and the later models of the Tupolev Tu-144.

NK-321 (136 kN cruise 245 kN, NK321M 280 to 300/350 kN (max 386)
NK-32-02 for An-124 Tu-160 and PAK DA
- NK-23D a hbp turbofan for alternative of AI-18T Lotarev D-18 within 230 250 kN thrust.
- Kuznetsov PD-30, a geared high-bypass turbofan variant derived from the NK-32 300 kN (max 328/350)

- Kuznetsov NK-34 turbojet. Intended for seaplanes.
- NK-44 turbofan. 400 kN (max up to 450)
- Kuznetsov NK-56 turbofan. Was to power the Ilyushin Il-96, but was cancelled in favor of the Aviadvigatel PS-90.
- NK-64 turbofan. 350 kN intended for Tu-204
- Kuznetsov NK-65 turbofan. Intended for PAK DA
- NK-74 270 kN engine for a modified Tu-160 for extended range
- Kuznetsov NK-86 turbofan. Upgraded version of the NK-8, powers the Ilyushin Il-86.
- Kuznetsov NK-87 turbofan. Based on the NK-86, powers the Lun-class ekranoplan.
- Kuznetsov NK-88 experimental turbofan. Powers the Tupolev Tu-155 hydrogen and LNG powered aircraft.
- Kuznetsov NK-89 experimental turbofan. Was to power the unbuilt Tupolev Tu-156.
- Kuznetsov NK-92 turbofan (modified to NK-93 further on). 220 to < 350 kN
- Kuznetsov NK-93 propfan. Projected to power the Il-96, Tu-204, and Tu-330.
- Kuznetsov NK-114 Ekranoplanes and aircraft engines
- Kuznetsov NK-116 Beriev Be-2500 Neptun engine
- Kuznetsov NK-144 afterburning turbofan. Powered the early models of the Tupolev Tu-144 supersonic transport.
- Kuznetsov NK-444 projectual
- NK-256 projectual engine with take-off thrust up to 200-220 kN
- NK-301

=== Industrial gas turbines ===
Kuznetsov industrial gas turbines include:

- NK-12ST. Derivative of NK-12 turboprop. Serial production started in 1974. The engine is designed for gas pipelines.
- NK-16ST. Derivative of NK-8 turbofan. Serial production started in 1982. Used in gas compressor stations.
- NK-17ST/NK-18ST. Uprated versions of NK-16ST.
- NK-36ST. (25 MW) Derivative of NK-32 turbofan. Development tests conducted in 1990.
- NK-37. (25 MW) Modification of NK36ST
- NK-38ST. (16 MW) Derivative of NK-93 propfan (never flown). Development tests conducted in 1995. Serial production started in 1998.

=== Rocket engines ===
In 1959, Sergey Korolev ordered a new design of rocket engine from the Kuznetzov Bureau for the Global Rocket 1 (GR-1) Fractional Orbital Bombardment System (FOBS) intercontinental ballistic missile (ICBM), which was developed but never deployed. The result was the NK-9, one of the first staged-combustion cycle rocket engines. The design was developed by Kuznetsov into the NK-15 and NK-33 engines in the 1960s, and claimed them to be the highest-performance rocket engines ever built, which were to propel the N1 lunar rocket—one that was never successfully launched. As of 2011, the aging NK-33 remains the most efficient (in terms of thrust-to-mass ratio) LOX/Kerosene rocket engine ever created.

The Orbital Sciences Antares light-to-medium-lift launcher has two modified NK-33 in its first stage, a solid second stage and a hypergolic orbit stage. The NK-33s are first imported from Russia to the United States and then modified into Aerojet AJ26s, which involves removing some harnessing, adding U.S. electronics, qualifying it for U.S. propellants, and modifying the steering system.

The Antares rocket was successfully launched from NASA's Wallops Flight Facility on April 21, 2013. This marked the first successful launch of the NK-33 heritage engines built in early 1970s.

Kuznetsov rocket engines include:

- Kuznetsov oxygen-rich stage-combustion RP1/LOX rocket engine family. Including NK-9, NK-15, NK-19, NK-21, NK-33, NK-39, NK-43. The original version was designed to power an ICBM. In the 1970s some improved versions were built for the ill-fated Soviet Lunar mission. More than 150 NK-33 engines were produced and stored in a warehouse ever since, with 36 engines having been sold to Aerojet general in the 1990s. Two NK-33 derived engines (Aerojet AJ-26) are used in the first stage of the Antares rocket developed by Orbital Sciences Corporation. The Antares rocket was successfully launched from NASA's Wallops Flight Facility on April 21, 2013. This marked the first successful launch of the NK-33 heritage engines built in the early 1970s. RKTs Progress also uses the NK-33 as the first-stage engine of the lightweight version of the Soyuz rocket family, the Soyuz-2.1v.
- RD-107A rocket engine. Powers the first stage (boosters) of the Soyuz-2.1a and Soyuz-2.1b.
- RD-108A rocket engine. Powers the second (core) stage of the Soyuz-2.1a and Soyuz-2.1b.
