= Kuznetsov Design Bureau =

Soviet/Russian aircraft engine design office

- Industry: Aerospace
- Founded: 1946
- Defunct: 2009
- Fate: Merged with three other companies
- Successor: JSC Kuznetsov
- Headquarters: Samara, Russia
- Products: Aircraft engines, rocket engines, turbines

The Kuznetsov Design Bureau (Russian: СНТК им. Н. Д. Кузнецова, also known as OKB-276) was a Russian design bureau for aircraft engines, administrated in Soviet times by Nikolai Dmitriyevich Kuznetsov. It was also known as (G)NPO Trud (or NPO Kuznetsov) and Kuybyshev Engine Design Bureau (KKBM).

NPO Trud was replaced in 1994 by a Joint Stock Company (JSC), Kuznetsov R & E C.

By the early 2000s the lack of funding caused by the poor economic situation in Russia had brought Kuznetsov to the verge of bankruptcy. In 2009 the Russian government decided to consolidate a number of engine-making companies in the Samara region under a new legal entity. This was named JSC Kuznetsov, after the design bureau.

== Products ==
=== Aircraft engines ===
The Kuznetsov Bureau first became notable for producing the monstrous Kuznetsov NK-12 turboprop engine that powered the Tupolev Tu-95 bomber beginning in 1952 as a development of the Junkers 0022 engine. The new engine eventually generated about 15,000 horsepower (11.2 megawatts) and it was also used in the large Antonov An-22 Soviet Air Force transport.

Kuznetsov also produced the Kuznetsov NK-8 turbofan engine in the 90 kN (20,000 lb_{f}) class that powered the Ilyushin Il-62 and Tupolev Tu-154 airliners. This engine was next upgraded to become the about 125 kN (28,000 lb_{f}) Kuznetsov NK-86 engine that powered the Ilyushin Il-86 aircraft. This Bureau also produced the Kuznetsov NK-144 afterburning turbofan engine. This engine powered the early models of the Tupolev Tu-144 SST.

The Kuznetsov Design Bureau also produced the Kuznetsov NK-87 turbofan engine that was used on the Lun-class ekranoplan. (Only one such aircraft has ever been produced.)

Kuznetsov's most powerful aviation engine is the Kuznetsov NK-321 that propels the Tupolev Tu-160 bomber and was formerly used in the later models of the Tu-144 supersonic transport (an SST that is now obsolete and no longer flown). The NK-321 produced a maximum of about 245 kN (55,000 lb_{f}) of thrust.

Kuznetsov aircraft engines include:

- RD-12 turbojet.
- RD-14 turbojet.
- RD-20 turboprop. BMW 003; powered the MiG-9.
- TV-022 turboprop. Reproduction of the Junkers Jumo 022.
- TV-2 turboprop. Improved version of TV-022.
- NK-4 turboprop. Powered the early Antonov An-10 and Ilyushin Il-18.
- NK-6 afterburning turbofan. Tested on the Tupolev Tu-95LL and was considered for the Tupolev Tu-22 and Tupolev Tu-123, but this never happened.
- NK-8 turbofan. Powers the original Ilyushin Il-62, A-90 Orlyonok ekranoplan and the Tupolev Tu-154A and B models.
- NK-12 contra rotating turboprop. Powers all the versions of the Tupolev Tu-95, Tupolev Tu-114, Tupolev Tu-126, Antonov An-22 and the A-90 Orlyonok ekranoplan. Initially designated as TV-12, but renamed to NK-12 in honor of company founder Nikolai Kuznetsov.
- NK-14 nuclear-powered engine. Powered the inboard engine of the prototype Tupolev Tu-119 nuclear-powered aircraft; a modified version of the Tupolev Tu-95.
- NK-16 turboprop. Was to power the Tupolev Tu-96.
- NK-22 afterburning turbofan. Powered the Tupolev Tu-22M0, M1 and M2.
- NK-25 afterburning turbofan. Powers the Tupolev Tu-22M3.
- NK-26 turboprop. Intended for ekranoplans.
- NK-32 afterburning turbofan. Powers the Tupolev Tu-160 and the later models of the Tupolev Tu-144.

NK-321 (136 kN cruise 245 kN, NK321M 280 to 300/350 kN, max 386)
NK-32-02 for An-124 Tu-160 and PAK DA

  - Kuznetsov PD-30, a geared high-bypass turbofan variant for the An-124 transport or airliners, derived from the NK-32 300 kN (max 328/350)
- NK-34 projectural turbojet. Intended for seaplanes.
- NK-44 turbofan. 400 kN (max up to 450 kN)
- NK-46 turbofan. Cryogenic design intended to power the Tupolev Tu-306 (a 450-seat derivative of the Tu-304).
- NK-56 turbofan. Was to power the Ilyushin Il-96, but was cancelled in favor of the Aviadvigatel PS-90.
- NK-62 propfan. Sporting contra-rotating propellers (four blades per propeller) of 4.7 m (15 ft 5 in) in diameter, the engine had a thrust of 245 kN (25,000 kgf; 55,000 lbf) and a thrust-specific fuel consumption (TSFC) of 0.288 lb/(lbf⋅h) (8.2 g/(kN⋅s)) at takeoff. The NK-62 was the most powerful turboprop or propfan ever built, though it never entered service. Tested from 1982 to 1990, the engine was designed for a cruise speed of Mach 0.75 at an altitude of 11,000 m (36,000 ft). Cruise thrust was 44.1 kN (4,500 kgf; 9,900 lbf), and cruise TSFC was 0.48 lb/(lbf⋅h) (14 g/(kN⋅s)). The NK-62 was briefly considered for early designs of the Antonov An-70 and for a re-engine of the Antonov An-124.
- NK-62M propfan. Developed in 1985–1987, this 4,850 kg engine (10,690 lb) was an uprated 285.2 kN (29,080 kgf; 64,100 lbf) thrust version of the NK-62, with 314.7 kN (32,090 kgf; 70,700 lbf) of emergency thrust available. Its TSFC was 0.28–0.29 lb/(lbf⋅h) (7.9–8.2 g/(kN⋅s)) during takeoff and 0.45 lb/(lbf⋅h) (13 g/(kN⋅s)) during cruise. The engine was proposed for use on the Myasishchev M-90 giant detachable aircraft.
- NK-63 propfan. Ducted propfan based on the NK-32.
- NK-64 turbofan. 350 kN intended for Tu-204
- NK-65 turbofan. Intended for PAK DA
- NK-74 270 kN engine for a modified Tu-160 for extended range
- NK-86 turbofan. Upgraded version of the NK-8, powers the Ilyushin Il-86.
- NK-87 turbofan. Based on the NK-86, powers the Lun-class ekranoplan.
- NK-88 experimental turbofan. Powers the Tupolev Tu-155 hydrogen and LNG powered aircraft.
- NK-89 experimental turbofan. Was to power the unbuilt Tupolev Tu-156.
- NK-92 turbofan (modified to NK-93 further on). 220 to < 350 kN
- NK-93 propfan. Ducted, geared propfan intended for the Ilyushin Il-96, Tupolev Tu-204 and Tupolev Tu-330.
- NK-94 propfan. Cryogenic, liquefied natural gas (LNG) version of the NK-93. Proposed for the 160-seat Tupolev Tu-156M2, Tu-214, and Tu-338.
- NK-104
- NK-105A
- NK-108 propfan. Like the NK-110, except in tractor instead of pusher configuration.
- NK-110 propfan. Like the NK-62, this engine had four-bladed contra-rotating propellers of 4.7 m (15 ft 5 in) in diameter, and it supported a cruise speed of Mach 0.75 at 11,000 m (36,000 ft) altitude. The NK-110 had a takeoff thrust of 176.5 kN (18,000 kgf; 39,700 lbf) and TSFC of 0.189 lb/lbf/h (5.4 g/kN/s). In cruise it provided 47.64 kN (4,858 kgf; 10,710 lbf) thrust with a TSFC of 0.440 lb/lbf/h (12.5 g/kN/s). The engine was tested in December 1988 but was never certified because of funding problems. Intended for the Tupolev Tu-404.
- NK-112 turbofan. Cryogenic design intended to power the twin-engine Tupolev Tu-336 (a 120-seat stretched derivative of the Tu-334).
- NK-114 turbojet. Derived from the NK-93.
- NK-144 afterburning turbofan. Powered the early models of the Tupolev Tu-144 supersonic transport.
- NK-256 projectual engine with take-off thrust up to 200-220 kN
- NK-301

=== Industrial gas turbines ===
Kuznetsov industrial gas turbines include:

- NK-12ST. Derivative of the NK-12 turboprop. Serial production started in 1974. The engine is designed for gas pipelines.
- NK-14ST. (8 MW) 32 percent efficiency, pressure ratio of 9.5, turbine inlet temperature of 1,203 K (2,165 °R; 930 °C; 1,706 °F), exhaust gas flow rate of 37.1 kg/s (82 lb/s), fuel gas consumption of 1,900 kg/h (4,200 lb/h), and weight of 3,700 kg (8,200 lb).
- NK-16ST. Derivative of the NK-8 turbofan. Serial production started in 1982. Used in gas compressor stations.
- NK-17ST/NK-18ST. Uprated versions of the NK-16ST gas turbine.
- NK-36ST. (25 MW) Derivative of the NK-32 turbofan. Development tests conducted in 1990.
- NK-37. (25 MW) Modification of the NK-36ST gas turbine. Designed for electric powerplants with a steam-gas plant. 36.4 percent efficiency, pressure ratio of 23.12, turbine inlet temperature of 1,420 K (2,560 °R; 1,150 °C; 2,100 °F), exhaust gas flow rate of 101.4 kg/s (224 lb/s), fuel gas consumption of 5,163 kg/h (11,380 lb/h), and weight of 9,840 kg (21,690 lb).
- NK-38ST. (16 MW) Derivative of the NK-93 propfan. Development tests conducted in 1995. Serial production started in 1998.
- NK-39. (16 MW) Modification of the NK-38ST gas turbine. Designed for electric powerplants with a steam-gas plant. 38 percent efficiency, pressure ratio of 25.9, turbine inlet temperature of 1,476 K (2,657 °R; 1,203 °C; 2,197 °F), exhaust gas flow rate of 54.6 kg/s (120 lb/s), fuel gas consumption of 6,043 kg/h (13,320 lb/h), and weight of 7,200 kg (15,900 lb).

=== Rocket engines ===
In 1959, Sergey Korolev ordered a new design of rocket engine from the Kuznetsov Bureau for the Global Rocket 1 (GR-1) Fractional Orbital Bombardment System (FOBS) intercontinental ballistic missile (ICBM), which was developed but never deployed. The result was the NK-9, one of the first staged-combustion cycle rocket engines. Kuznetsov developed the design into the NK-15 and NK-33 engines in the 1960s, and claimed them to be the highest-performance rocket engines ever built. The engines were to propel the N1 lunar rocket, which in the end was never successfully launched. As of 2011, the aging NK-33 remains the most efficient (in terms of thrust-to-mass ratio) LOX/Kerosene rocket engine ever created.

The Orbital Sciences Antares light-to-medium-lift launcher has two modified NK-33 in its first stage, a solid second stage and a hypergolic orbit stage. The NK-33s are first imported from Russia to the United States and then modified into Aerojet AJ26s, which involves removing some harnessing, adding U.S. electronics, qualifying it for U.S. propellants, and modifying the steering system.

The Antares rocket was successfully launched from NASA's Wallops Flight Facility on April 21, 2013. This marked the first successful launch of the NK-33 heritage engines built in early 1970s.

Kuznetsov rocket engines include:

- Kuznetsov oxygen-rich stage-combustion RP1/LOX rocket engine family. Including NK-9, NK-15, NK-19, NK-21, NK-33, NK-39, NK-43. The original version was designed to power an ICBM. In the 1970s some improved versions were built for the ill-fated Soviet Lunar mission. More than 150 NK-33 engines were produced and stored in a warehouse ever since, with 36 engines having been sold to Aerojet general in the 1990s. Two NK-33 derived engines (Aerojet AJ-26) are used in the first stage of the Antares rocket developed by Orbital Sciences Corporation. The Antares rocket was successfully launched from NASA's Wallops Flight Facility on April 21, 2013. This marked the first successful launch of the NK-33 heritage engines built in the early 1970s. TsSKB-Progress also uses the stockpile NK-33 as the first-stage engine of the lightweight version of the Soyuz rocket family, the Soyuz-2-1v.
- RD-107A rocket engine. Powers the boosters of the R-7 family including the Soyuz-FG and Soyuz-2.
- RD-108A rocket engine. Powers the core stage of the R-7 family including the Soyuz-FG and Soyuz-2.

== See also ==
- JSC Kuznetsov
