= Nikolai Kuznetsov (engineer) =

Russian aerospace engineer (1911–95)

Nikolai Dmitriyevich Kuznetsov
- Born: Николай Дмитриевич Кузнецов; 23 June 1911; Aktyubinsk, Russian Empire
- Died: 30 July 1995 (aged 84)
- Occupations: Chief Designer, General Designer of OKB-276(1949–1994)
- Known for: Aircraft and Rocket Engine designs

Signature
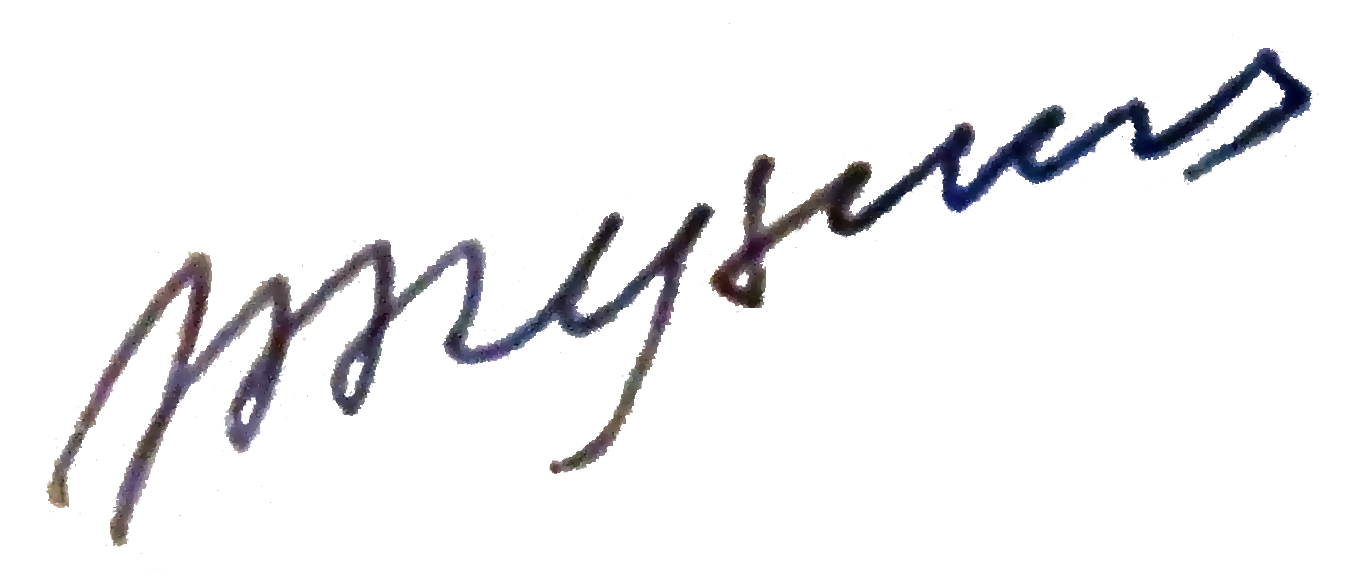

Nikolai Dmitriyevich Kuznetsov was a Chief Designer of the Soviet Design Bureau OKB-276 which deals with the development, manufacture and distribution of equipment, especially aircraft engines, turbines and gearboxes.

== Biography ==
Kuznetsov started his career as a professional coppersmith and he began working as a mechanic. In 1930 graduated from the school and enrolled at the Moscow Aviation College where he studied part-time and worked as a mechanic. In 1933 he joined the Aircraft Faculty in the Zhukovsky Air Force Engineering Academy. There he studied under Prof. Nikolai Jegorowitsch Schukowski - then the head of the department for aircraft engines research. Kuznetsov received a degree with honors in November 1938.

The topic of his diploma there was on motors: four-carburettor, 28-cylinder with a 4-star air-cooled power of 1500 hp at 3400 rpm and at an altitude of 6000 meters with two-high-speed driven centrifugal blowers.

In April 1939, Kuznetsov became a member of Communist Party organization of the academy and was elected a faculty. On 4 April 1941 he successfully defended his thesis on the structural integrity of aircraft engines while under NKVD interrogation. In the period from July to September 1942 he trained under a senior engineer of 239 fighter division 6th air force who met George Malenkov and praised the ability of Kuznetsov and subsequently sent his deputy to become a Designer at the Ufa Aviation Plant.

Here Kuznetsov worked from 1943 to 1949 first under the leadership of Klimov then as chief designer. In 1949 he was transferred to Kuybyshev (currently the City of Samara) which was headed by the State union pilot plant number 2 on the development and manufacture of advanced jet engines now known as Kuznetsov Design Bureau. There he worked with Sergei Korolev, the famous Soviet rocket designer under NKVD supervision and control.

== Contributions ==
After World War II, captured German turbine specialists were brought along with some of the gas turbines to the Soviet Union by the NKVD. In addition to the already established Jumo 004 and BMW 003 engines they brought along the design documents and plans of Jumo 022 project.

In 1949, Kuznetsov was appointed as chief designer of jet engines at OKB-276 ("Experimental design bureau-276") and started developing turboprop designs further with the help of the German specialists being held in NKVD custody.

It proved to be a successful engine and was completed in 1955. The new turboprop engine, named Kuznetsov NK-12, displayed great performance and was developed up to 11,000 kW. It was used in the Antonov An-22 aircraft, A-90 Orlyonok Ekranoplane and the Tupolev Tu-95 strategic bomber among others. The later models produced around 15,000 kW.

In 1954, he began work on a two-flow jet engine with afterburner, called the Kuznetsov NK-6, which was never completed.

In 1957, he received the Order of Hero of Socialist Labor for his contributions.

From 1959 onwards, he was also involved in the development of engines for the projected Soviet N1 Moon rocket. The primary engines for the development rockets were Kuznetsov NK-15 and Kuznetsov NK-15V (later developed into Kuznetsov NK-33 and Kuznetsov NK-43). Ultimately, these designs were successful but arrived too late. By the time the bugs in this very advanced design were rectified, the N1 rocket program had been cancelled. Several stockpiled NK-33 engines were refurbished and modified by Aerojet and used for the Orbital Sciences Antares.

In the 1960s he developed aircraft engines specifically for the world's first supersonic transport aircraft to fly Tupolev Tu-144, the Kuznetsov NK-144 turbofan. This was however inefficient and replaced by the Kolesov RD-36.

Based on these design experiences, the engine Kuznetsov NK-321 (also known as NK-32-1) was developed later for the supersonic, variable-geometry heavy bomber Tupolev Tu-160, which is also in the more powerful version of the Tupolev Tu-144 (version Tu-144LL).

In the late 1980s OKB- 267 began the development of the fuel sipping Turbo Fan Engine Kuznetsov NK-93, which has a by-pass ratio of almost 17:1 and thus an engine of a unique design in the world.

== Awards ==
- Hero of Socialist Labor (Twice)
- Honorary Citizen of Kuybyshev in 1982.

== See also ==
- Sergey Tumansky
