= Power pack =

Power pack or powerpack may refer to:

== Devices ==
- Power Pack (battery series), a line of multi-cell batteries originally manufactured by Everready
- Powerpack (drivetrain), a term for a modular powertrain, particularly in heavy-duty uses such as construction, military, and railways
- Powerpack (rocket engine), the set of valves and turbopumps that provide the proper fuel/oxidizer mix to the injectors and combustion chamber in a liquid chemical rocket engine
- Tesla Powerpack, a 200 kWh rechargeable lithium-ion battery for industrial usage
- A series of batteries (or battery cells) also called a battery pack
- A power supply (especially in the context of model trains, slot cars, and other hobbies)
- A radioisotope thermoelectric generator

== Entertainment and media ==
- Power Pack, Marvel Comics' preteen superhero team
- A science fiction term for an advanced battery pack or other power supply

== Other uses ==
- Operation Power Pack, a United States military action in the Dominican Republic in 1965

== See also ==
- Pack (disambiguation)
- Power (disambiguation)
