= BE-4 =

Large liquid methane fuelled staged-combustion rocket engine by Blue Origin

BE-4 (Blue Engine 4)
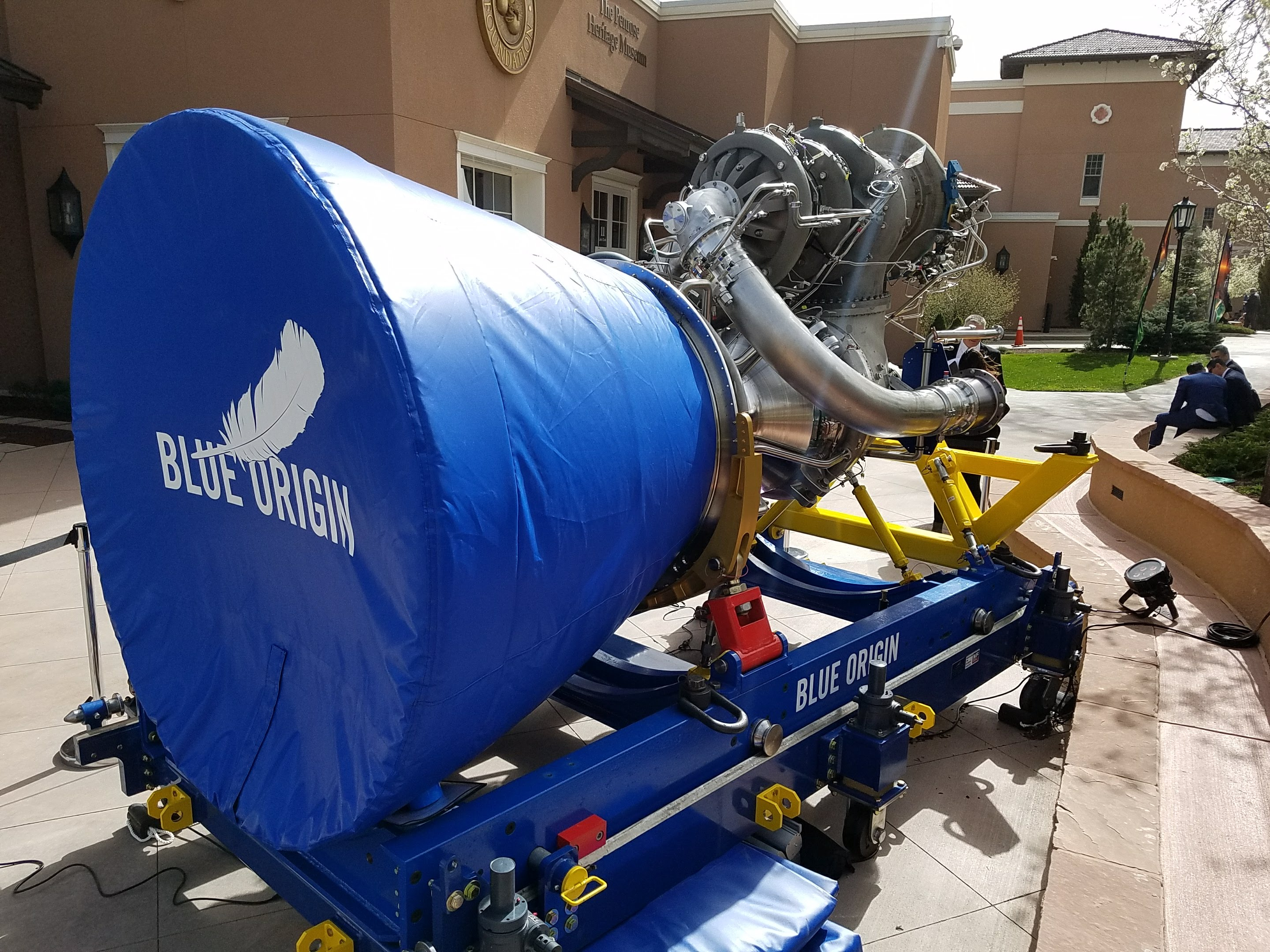
- The first hotfire-tested BE-4, serial number 103, at the 34th Space Symposium in Colorado Springs in April 2018, showing the liquid methane inlet side of the engine
- Country of origin: United States
- First flight: January 8, 2024
- Designer: Blue Origin
- Manufacturer: Blue Origin
- Associated LV: Vulcan Centaur; New Glenn
- Status: In production

Liquid-fuel engine
- Propellant: LOX / CH_{4}
- Cycle: Oxygen-rich staged combustion

Performance
- Thrust, sea-level: Original: 2,460 kN (550,000 lb_{f}); Improved: 2,850 kN (640,000 lb_{f})
- Throttle range: 40–100%
- Chamber pressure: 140 bar (2,000 psi)
- Specific impulse: 340 s (3.3 km/s)
- Burn time: Vulcan: 299 seconds; New Glenn: 191 seconds
- Gimbal range: ±5°

Dimensions
- Dry mass: Original: 5,400 kg (11,900 lb)

The BE-4 (Blue Engine 4) is a liquid rocket engine developed by Blue Origin. It uses liquefied methane fuel and operates on an oxygen-rich staged combustion cycle. The BE-4 originally produced 2,450 kN (550,000 lbf) of thrust at sea level and was uprated to 2,850 kN (640,000 lbf).

Development of the BE-4 was funded through a combination of private investments and public contracts.

Although initially intended solely for use on Blue Origin's proprietary launch vehicle, the New Glenn, the engine was also selected in 2014 by United Launch Alliance (ULA) for its Vulcan Centaur rocket, which replaces the Atlas V and Delta IV. ULA finalized the BE-4 as its choice in September 2018.

The BE-4 made its first flight aboard the Vulcan Centaur rocket on January 8, 2024. It was later launched on New Glenn for the first time on January 16, 2025.

== History ==
Following Aerojet's acquisition of Pratt & Whitney Rocketdyne in 2012, Blue Origin president Rob Meyerson saw an opportunity to fill a gap in the defense industrial base. Blue Origin publicly entered the liquid rocket engine business by partnering with ULA and other companies on the development of BE-4. Meyerson announced the selection of Huntsville, AL as the location of Blue Origin's rocket engine production factory in June 2017.

Blue Origin began work on the BE-4 in 2011, although the public announcement was made in September 2014. This was their first engine to combust liquid oxygen and methane propellants.

In September 2014 ULA selected BE-4 as the main engine for the Vulcan launch vehicle. Vulcan is a successor to the Atlas V, and BE-4 would replace the Russian-made RD-180 engine. Blue Origin said that the "BE-4 would be 'ready for flight' by 2017". Blue Origin indicated that they intend to make the engine available to companies beyond ULA.

By April 2015, two parallel development programs were under way. One program was testing full-scale versions of the BE-4 powerpack, the set of valves and turbopumps that provide the proper fuel/oxidizer mix to the injectors and combustion chamber. The second program was testing subscale versions of the engine's injectors. The company planned to begin full-scale engine testing in late 2016 and expected to complete development in 2017.

By September 2015, Blue Origin had completed more than 100 development tests of several elements of the BE-4, including the preburner and a "regeneratively cooled thrust chamber using multiple full-scale injector elements". The tests were used to confirm the theoretical model predictions of "injector performance, heat transfer, and combustion stability", and data collected was used to refine the engine design. A test device exploded on the test stand during 2015 during powerpack testing. Blue Origin built two larger and redundant test stands to follow, capable of testing the full thrust of the BE-4.

In January 2016, Blue Origin announced that they intended to begin testing full engines of the BE-4 on ground test stands prior to the end of 2016. Following a factory tour in March 2016, journalist Eric Berger noted that a large part of "Blue Origin's factory has been given over to development of the Blue Engine-4".

Initially, both first-stage and second-stage versions of the engine were planned. The second stage of the initial New Glenn design was to share the same stage diameter as the first stage and use a single vacuum-optimized BE-4, the BE-4U. Later, they backed away from this plan.

The first engine was fully assembled in March 2017. Also in March, ULA indicated that the economic risk of the Blue Origin engine selection option had been retired, but that the technical risk on the project would remain until engine firing tests were completed. In June 2017, Blue Origin announced that they would build a new facility in Huntsville, Alabama, to manufacture BE-4.

BE-4 was first test-fired, at 50% thrust for 3 seconds, in October 2017, rising by March 2018, to 65% for 114 seconds, by February 2019 to 73%, and by August 2019 to 100%. Testing and support took place at the company's orbital launch facility at Exploration Park in Florida, where Blue Origin invested more than US$200 million in facilities and improvements.

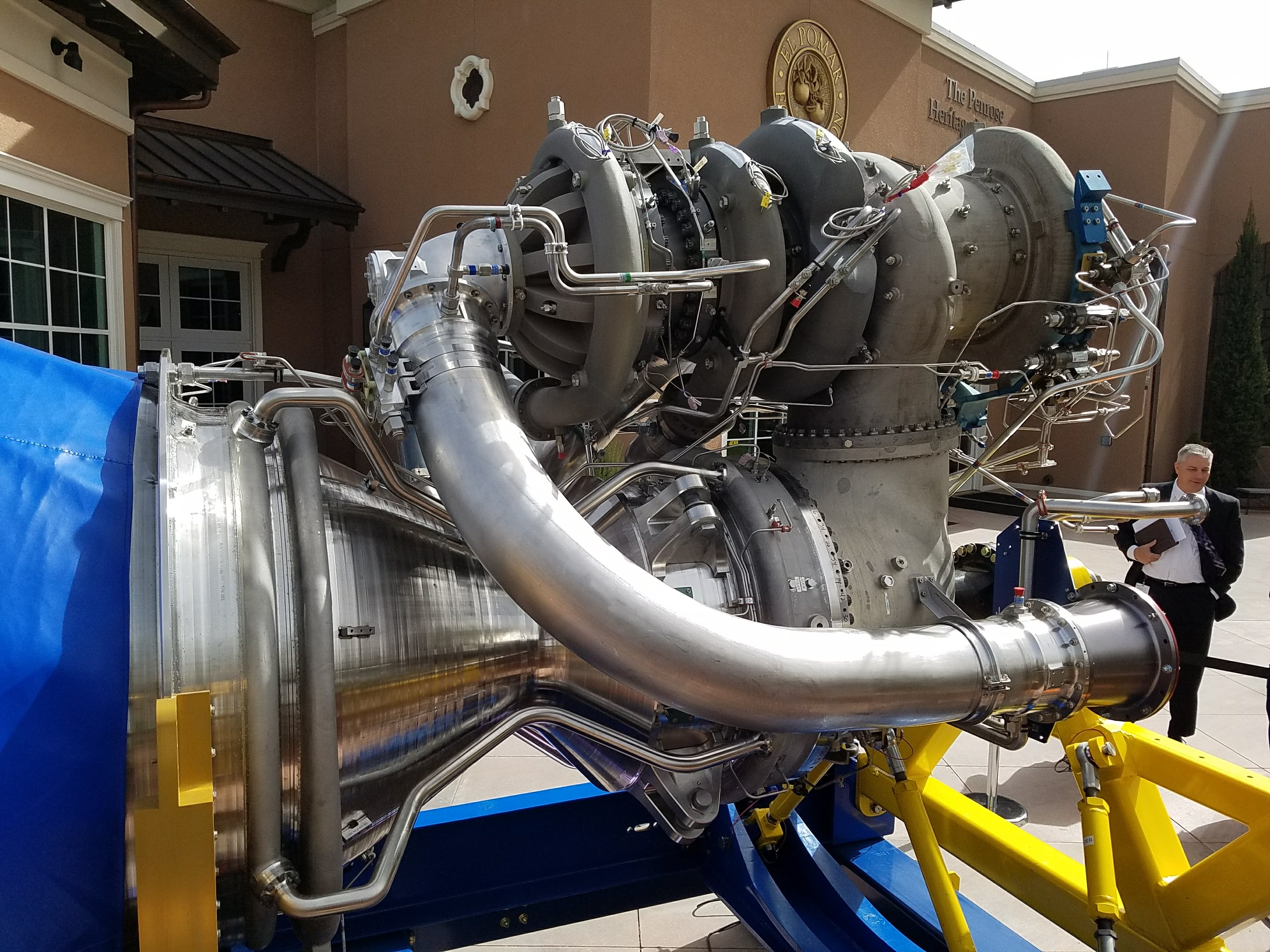
Blue Origin BE-4 rocket engine powerhead and combustion chamber, April 2018—methane inlet side view. This was the first BE-4 engine to be hotfire tested; the test occurred on October 18, 2017.

In October 2018, Blue Origin President Bob Smith announced that the first New Glenn launch had been moved back to 2021, followed in 2021 by an additional slip to late 2022. The first flight test of the BE-4 was then redirected for the initial Vulcan Centaur launch rather than on New Glenn.

In July 2020, the first pathfinder BE-4 was delivered to ULA for integration testing with Vulcan Centaur.

In August 2020, ULA CEO Tory Bruno stated that the second test BE-4 would be delivered soon, followed quickly by flight-qualified ones. He noted an ongoing issue with the BE-4's turbopumps. At the time, Blue Origin was still troubleshooting the 75,000-horsepower pumps. The issue continued until 2022.

On October 31, 2022, Blue Origin announced that the first two BE-4 engines were being integrated on a Vulcan rocket.

On May 11, 2023, Bruno stated that BE-4 qualification testing had been completed "several weeks ago", i.e., by the end of April 2023.

On June 30, 2023, a BE-4 engine exploded 10 seconds into testing, damaging the test stand.

On January 8, 2024, ULA successfully launched Vulcan-Centaur powered by BE-4.

As of 2024, there were two BE-4 production lines, one to supply ULA and one for New Glenn.

In November 2025, Blue Origin announced another demonstrated performance increase for BE-4, stating the maximum thrust had increased to 2,847 kN (640,000 lb_{f}).

Blue Origin announced an engine related to the BE-4 in November 2026, named Northstar, rated for 715,000 lbf (3,180 kN).

== Applications ==
=== Vulcan Centaur ===
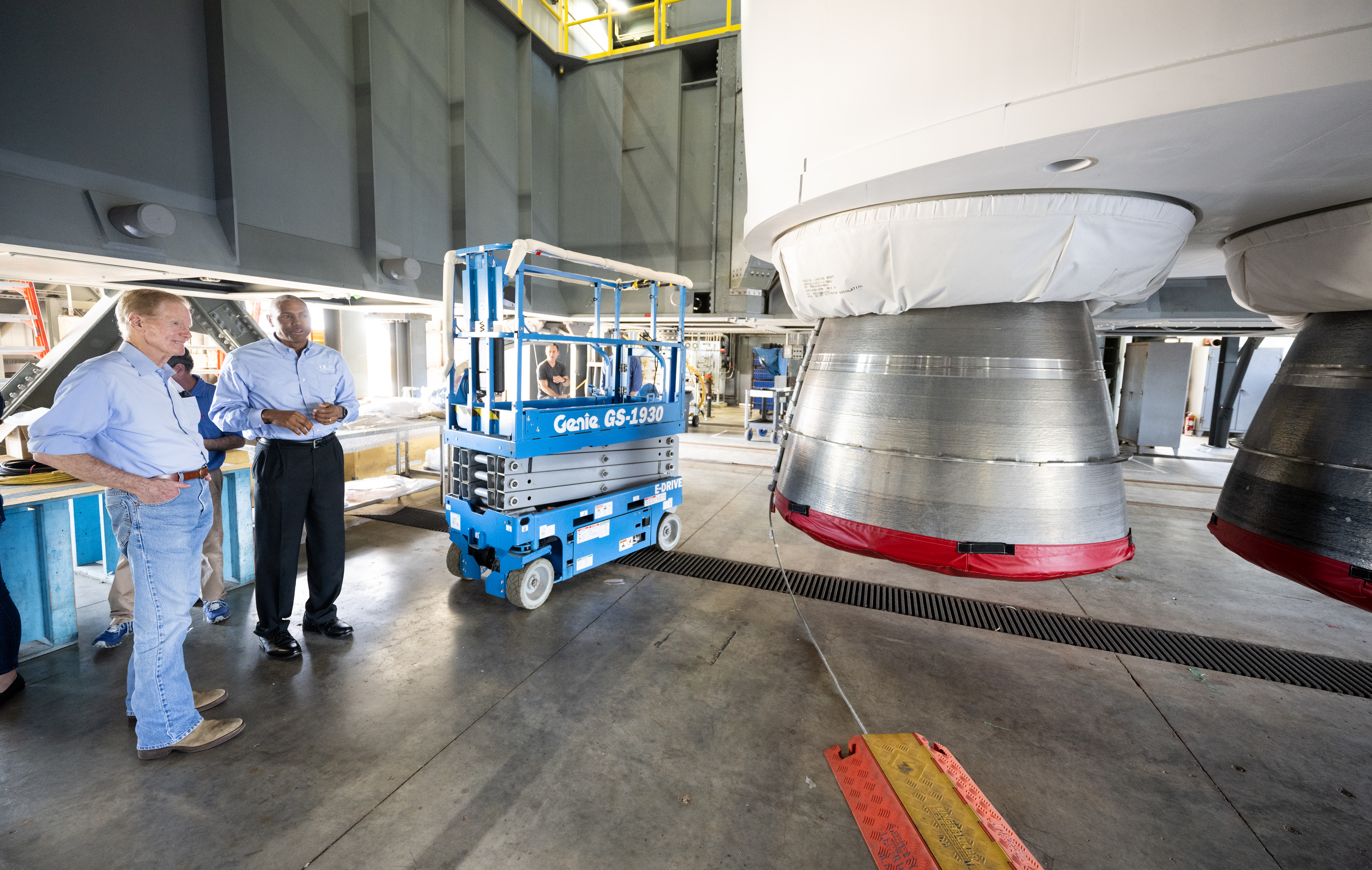
BE-4 powering the Vulcan Centaur.

Vulcan uses two of the 2,400 kN (550,000 lbf) BE-4 engines on each first stage.

The BE-4 competed with and defeated the AR1 engine for the Atlas V RD-180 replacement program. The AR1, like the RD-180, is kerosene-fueled.

In February 2016, the US Air Force issued a contract that provides partial development funding of up to US$202 million to ULA in order to support use of the Blue Origin BE-4 engine on the ULA Vulcan launch vehicle.

The original USAF contract to Aerojet Rocketdyne (AR) to advance development of the AR1 engine was US$536 million, but by June 2018, the USAF had decreased its contribution—5/6ths of the total cost—to US$294 million. ARR put no additional private funds into effort after early 2018.

Vulcan launched on January 8, 2024. The engines performed flawlessly, propelling Peregrine Mission One to Trans-lunar injection. Vulcan was the first methane-fueled rocket to reach orbit on its first attempt, and the first to reach orbit from the US.

=== New Glenn ===
The BE-4 is used on Blue Origin's New Glenn, a 7.0-meter (23 ft)-diameter two-stage orbital launch vehicle with an optional third stage. The first stage is powered by seven BE-4 engines and is reusable, landing vertically. The second stage has same diameter and use two BE-3 vacuum-optimized LH2/LOX engines. The second stage is expendable.

New Glenn launched on January 16, 2025, in which all of the seven engines performed well in ascent flight, except on the landing attempt, where the first stage booster failed at some point during the atmospheric reentry.

=== XS-1 ===
Boeing secured a contract to design and build the DARPA XS-1 reusable spaceplane in 2014. The XS-1 was to accelerate to hypersonic speed at the edge of the Earth's atmosphere to enable its payload to reach orbit. In 2015, a modified BE-4 was believed to be the primary source of propulsion. In May 2017, the contract award selected the RS-25-derived Aerojet Rocketdyne AR-22 engine instead. The XS-1 was cancelled in 2020.

=== Orbital ATK ===
As of March 2016, Orbital ATK was evaluating Blue Origin engines for its launch vehicles, although they eventually went in another direction.

== Technical specifications ==
The BE-4 is a staged combustion cycle engine, with a single oxygen-rich preburner, and a single turbine driving both the fuel and oxygen pumps. The cycle is similar to the kerosene-fueled RD-180 currently, although it uses only a single combustion chamber and nozzle.

The BE-4 is designed for long life and high reliability, partially by aiming the engine to be a "medium-performing version of a high-performance architecture". Hydrostatic bearings are used in the turbopumps rather than the more typical ball and roller bearings specifically to increase reliability and service life.

Using methane allows for autogenous pressurization, which is the use of gasified propellant to pressurize liquid propellant. This is beneficial because it eliminates the need for pressurization systems that require the storage of a pressurizing gas such as helium.

- Thrust (sea level): 2,800 kN (640,000 lbf) at full power
- Chamber pressure: 14 MPa (2,000 psi), substantially lower than the 26 MPa (3,700 psi) of the RD-180 and 35 MPa (5,100 psi) of Raptor 3
- Designed for reusability — up to 100 flights
- Relightable in-flight via head-pressure start of the turbine
- Tested deep throttling capability to at least 40% power

== See also ==
- Comparison of orbital rocket engines
- BE-3 – hydrogen-fueled engine currently in operation by Blue Origin
- Raptor – methane-fueled engine developed by SpaceX
- Merlin – kerosene-fueled operational engine by SpaceX
- RD-180 – modern Russian kerosene-fueled engine of comparable size
