= Kuznetsov NK-25 =

1960s Soviet turbofan aircraft engine

NK-25
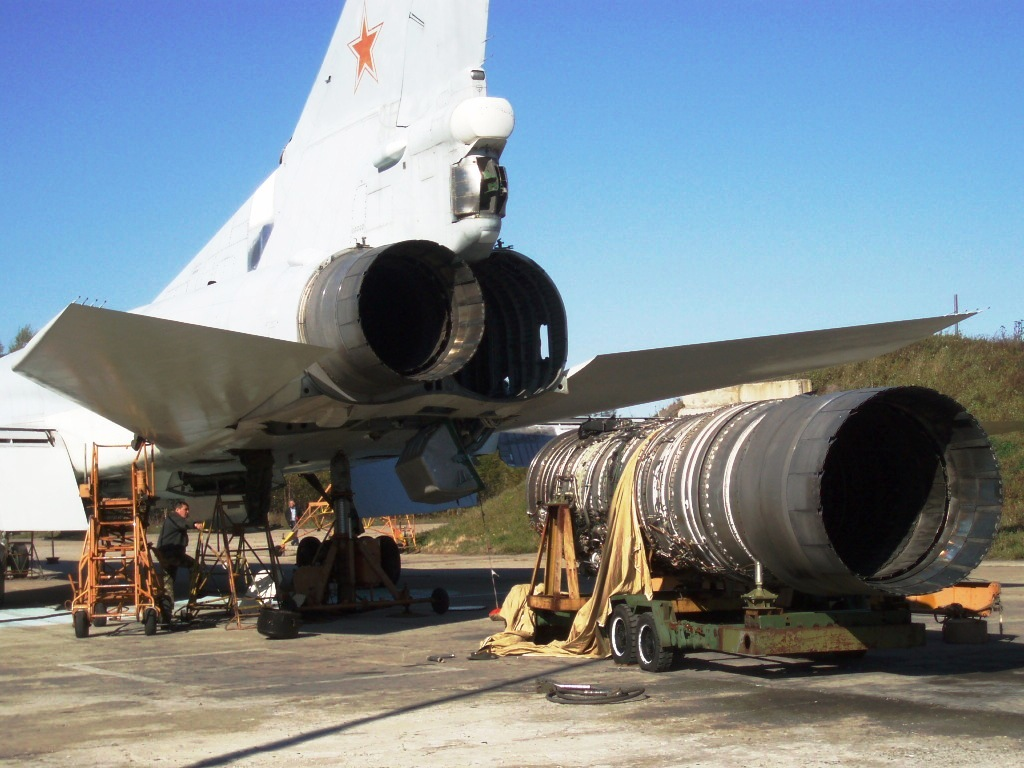
- Type: Turbofan
- National origin: Soviet Union
- Manufacturer: Kuznetsov Design Bureau
- Major applications: Tupolev Tu-22M

The Kuznetsov NK-25 is a turbofan aircraft engine made by the Soviet Kuznetsov Design Bureau and used in the Tupolev Tu-22M strategic bomber. One of the most powerful supersonic engines in service today, it is rated at 245 kN (55,000 lbf) thrust. The three shaft engine was designed in the years 1972–1974.

== Applications ==
- Tupolev Tu-142LL (testbed)
- Tupolev Tu-22M3
- Tupolev Tu-22MR

== Specifications (NK-25) ==
Data from motor-s.ru, Otechestvennaya aviatsionno-kosmicheskaya tekhnika - SAMARSKIY NTK and engine.aviaport.ru

==== General characteristics ====
- Type: Three-spool low-bypass afterburning turbofan
- Length: 7,300 mm (290 in)
- Diameter: 1,770 mm (70 in) at the nozzle casing
- Dry weight: 3,575 kg (7,882 lb)

==== Components ====
- Compressor: 3-stage LP, 5-stage IP and 7-stage HP
- Combustors: Annular multi-nozzle combustion chamber
- Turbine: 4-stage axial turbine

==== Performance ====
- Maximum thrust:
  - 245 kN (55,000 lbf) wet
  - 145 kN (33,000 lbf) dry
- Overall pressure ratio: 25.9
- Bypass ratio: 1.45
- Turbine inlet temperature: 1,597 K (1,324 °C; 2,415 °F)
- Specific fuel consumption:
  - 2.1 kg/(kgf⋅h) wet
  - 0.58 kg/(kgf⋅h) dry
- Thrust-to-weight ratio: 6.99 kgf/kg (31.1 N/lb)

== See also ==
Comparable engines

- Kuznetsov NK-22
- Kuznetsov NK-32

Related lists

- List of aircraft engines
