= Powerhead (rocket engine) =

Major component of a liquid rocket engine

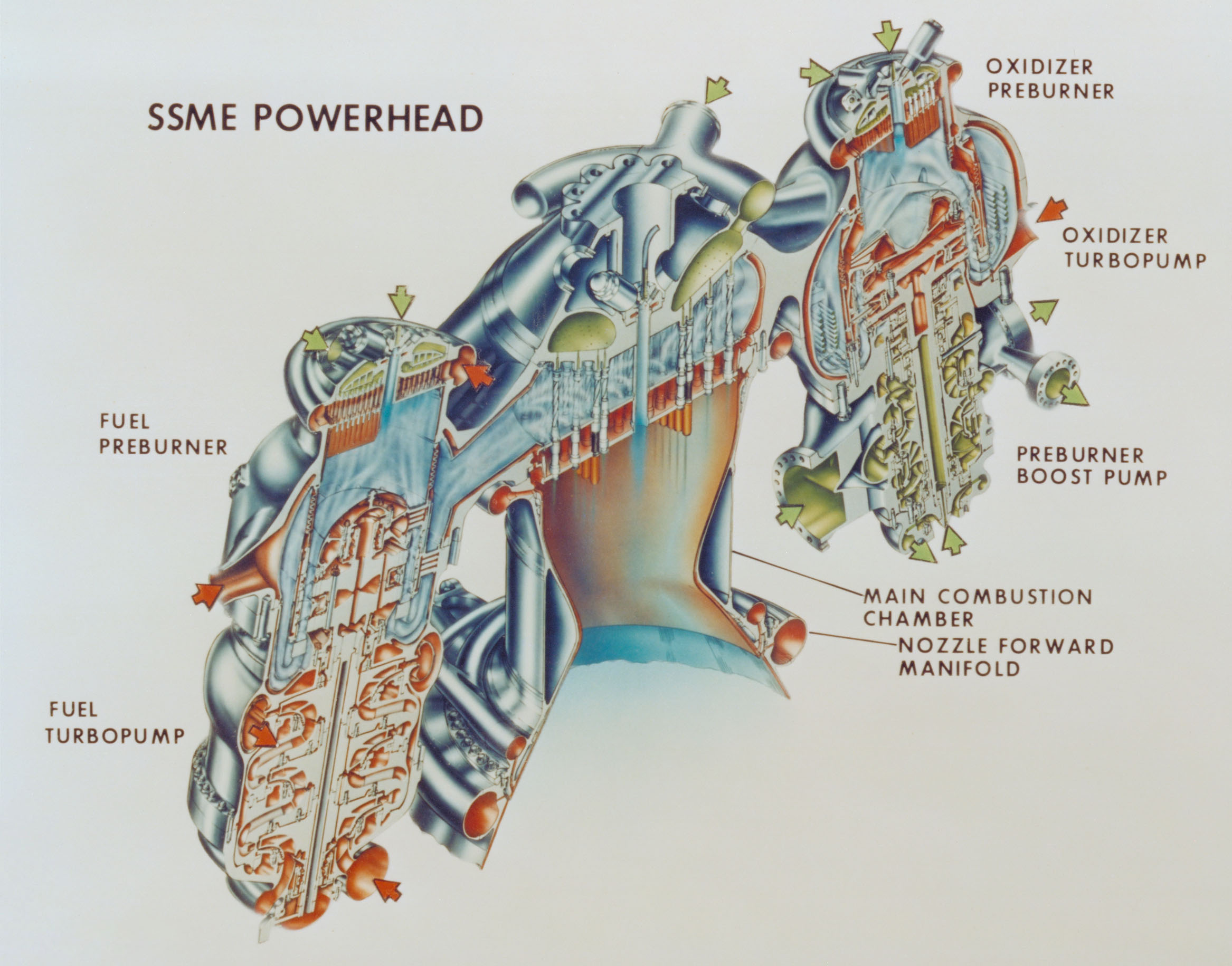
Diagram showing the powerhead of the Space Shuttle Main Engine

A liquid rocket engine powerhead (or powerpack) is the collective term for the section of a rocket engine consisting of turbopumps, preburners / gas generators, and all the requisite equipment for a non-pressure-fed engine cycle, minus the combustion chamber and the expansion nozzle.

== Components and engine cycle ==
The principal elements of a powerhead are the turbopumps, which raise propellant pressures from tank to injector levels. A gas generator or one or more preburners that produce relatively cool working gas to drive the turbines, and the ducts, manifolds and valves that route the propellants between them and into the main combustion chamber (in closed cycles) or overboard (in open cycles).

The complexity of the powerhead is largely set by the engine's thermodynamic cycle. In an open gas-generator cycle, a small fraction of the propellants is burned and the turbine exhaust is dumped overboard, giving a mechanically simple but slightly less efficient powerhead. In a staged combustion cycle the preburner gas is routed into the main chamber instead, raising performance but demanding higher pressures, more demanding seals and more careful materials selection. In a full-flow staged combustion cycle the entire propellant flow passes through two preburners - one fuel-rich, one oxidizer-rich - each driving its own turbopump. Spreading the turbine load across the full propellant flow keeps turbine inlet temperatures lower than in conventional staged combustion.

== Examples ==
=== Space Shuttle Main Engine ===
The RS-25 used a closed, fuel-rich staged combustion cycle. Its powerhead - the two preburners, the hot-gas manifold and the main injector, to which the two high-pressure turbopumps were bolted, was repeatedly redesigned during the Shuttle programme to improve durability, including the introduction of a two-duct hot-gas manifold in 1995, a redesigned high-pressure oxidizer turbopump and a large-throat main combustion chamber.

=== Integrated Powerhead Demonstrator ===
The Integrated Powerhead Demonstrator (IPD) was a joint NASA / Air Force Research Laboratory technology programme run from the mid-1990s through the 2000s with prime contractors Pratt & Whitney Rocketdyne and Aerojet. It was a 1.1 MN (250,000 lbf) ground demonstrator of a hydrogen/oxygen full-flow staged combustion cycle using hydrostatic bearings in the turbopumps in place of conventional rolling-element bearings. Component testing of the workhorse preburner and oxidizer turbopump took place at the John C. Stennis Space Center E-1 stand in 2002-2003, followed by integrated tests of the full demonstrator that reached the 100% power level on 12 July 2006, no flight engine was developed.

=== J-2X ===
For the J-2X upper-stage engine, developed by Pratt & Whitney Rocketdyne for the Constellation and Space Launch System programmes, NASA used a dedicated powerpack assembly, designated PPA1A (tested in 2008 with heritage J-2S turbomachinery) and PPA2 (tested in 2012 with new J-2X hardware), to characterize the turbopumps, gas generator and ducting independently of the thrust chamber. On 8 June 2012, a 1,150-second PPA2 firing at the Stennis A-1 test stand set a duration record for the centre's A Test Complex. The previous record had been a 1,075-second SSME test in August 1989.

=== BE-4 ===
Blue Origin ran parallel full-scale powerpack and injector test programmes during development of the BE-4 methane/oxygen engine. SpaceNews described the powerpack as "the set of valves and turbopumps that provide the proper fuel/oxidizer mix to the injectors and combustion chamber". On 13 May 2017 the company lost a set of powerpack test hardware on one of its West Texas test stands, calling such incidents "not unusual during development".

=== Raptor ===
SpaceX's Raptor, a methane/oxygen full-flow staged combustion cycle engine, became the first engine of that cycle to power a vehicle in flight when it flew on the Starship Super Heavy in April 2023.

== See also ==
- Integrated Powerhead Demonstrator
- Rocket engine
- Turbopump
- Preburner
