= NK-33 =

Soviet rocket engine

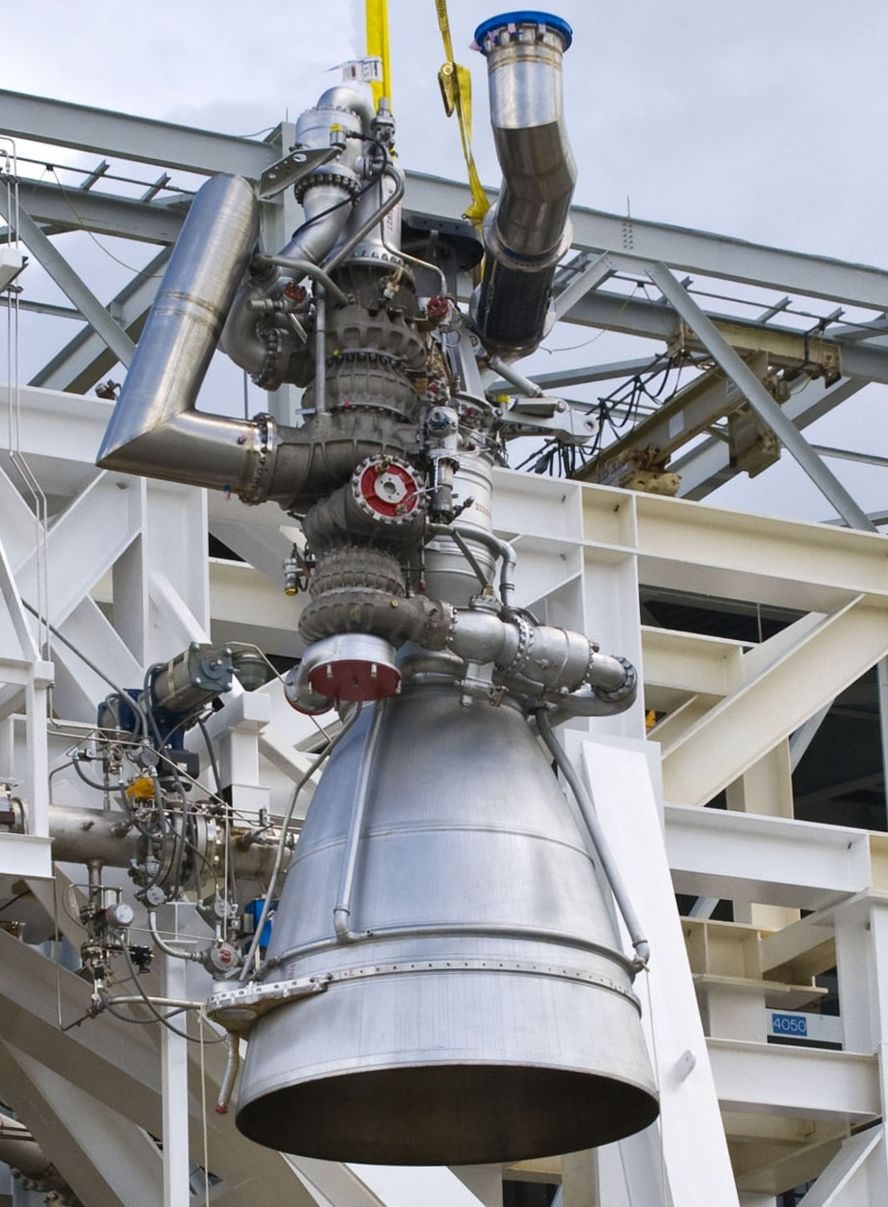
- The Russian NK-33 was modified and renamed the AJ26-58 by Aerojet. This AJ26-58 is shown on the test stand at John C. Stennis Space Center.
- Country of origin: Soviet Union
- Date: 1970s
- Designer: Kuznetsov Design Bureau
- Manufacturer: JSC Kuznetsov (Mashinostroitel)
- Application: 1st/2nd-stage engine
- Associated LV: N1A; Antares 100; Soyuz-2.1v
- Predecessor: NK-15, NK-15V
- Successor: AJ26-58, AJ26-59, AJ26-62

Liquid-fuel engine
- Propellant: LOX / RP-1
- Cycle: Staged combustion
- Pumps: Turbopump

Performance
- Thrust, vacuum: 1,680 kN (380,000 lb_{f})
- Thrust, sea-level: 1,510 kN (340,000 lb_{f})
- Throttle range: 50–105%
- Thrust-to-weight ratio: 137
- Chamber pressure: 14.83 MPa (2,151 psi)
- Specific impulse, vacuum: 331 s (3.25 km/s)
- Specific impulse, sea-level: 297 s (2.91 km/s)

Dimensions
- Length: 3.7 m (12 ft)
- Diameter: 1.4905 m (4 ft 10.68 in)
- Dry mass: 1,240 kg (2,730 lb)

The NK-33 (GRAU index: 14D15) and its vacuum-optimized variant, the NK-43, were rocket engines developed in the late 1960s and early 1970s by the Kuznetsov Design Bureau for the Soviet space program's ill-fated N1 Moon rocket. The NK-33 is among the most powerful LOX/RP-1 powered rocket engines ever built, noted for its high specific impulse and low structural mass.

The NK-33 was an improved version of the earlier NK-15 engine, which powered the original N1 launch vehicle. Key upgrades included simplified pneumatic and hydraulic systems, advanced controls, enhanced turbopumps, an improved combustion chamber, fewer interfaces employing pyrotechnic devices, and modified interfaces to facilitate replacement of parts during refurbishment.

Each N1F rocket would have utilized 30 NK-33 engines on its first stage and eight NK-43 engines on its second stage. Consequently, when the Soviet Union aborted its lunar landing effort in 1974, dozens of already manufactured engines were left in storage.

Decades later, they found new life powering the first stage of the American Antares 100 and the Russian Soyuz-2.1v rockets. The supply of NK-33 engines was reportedly exhausted by early 2025. Russia planned to replace the NK-33 on the Soyuz-2.1v with the RD-193 engine.

== Design ==
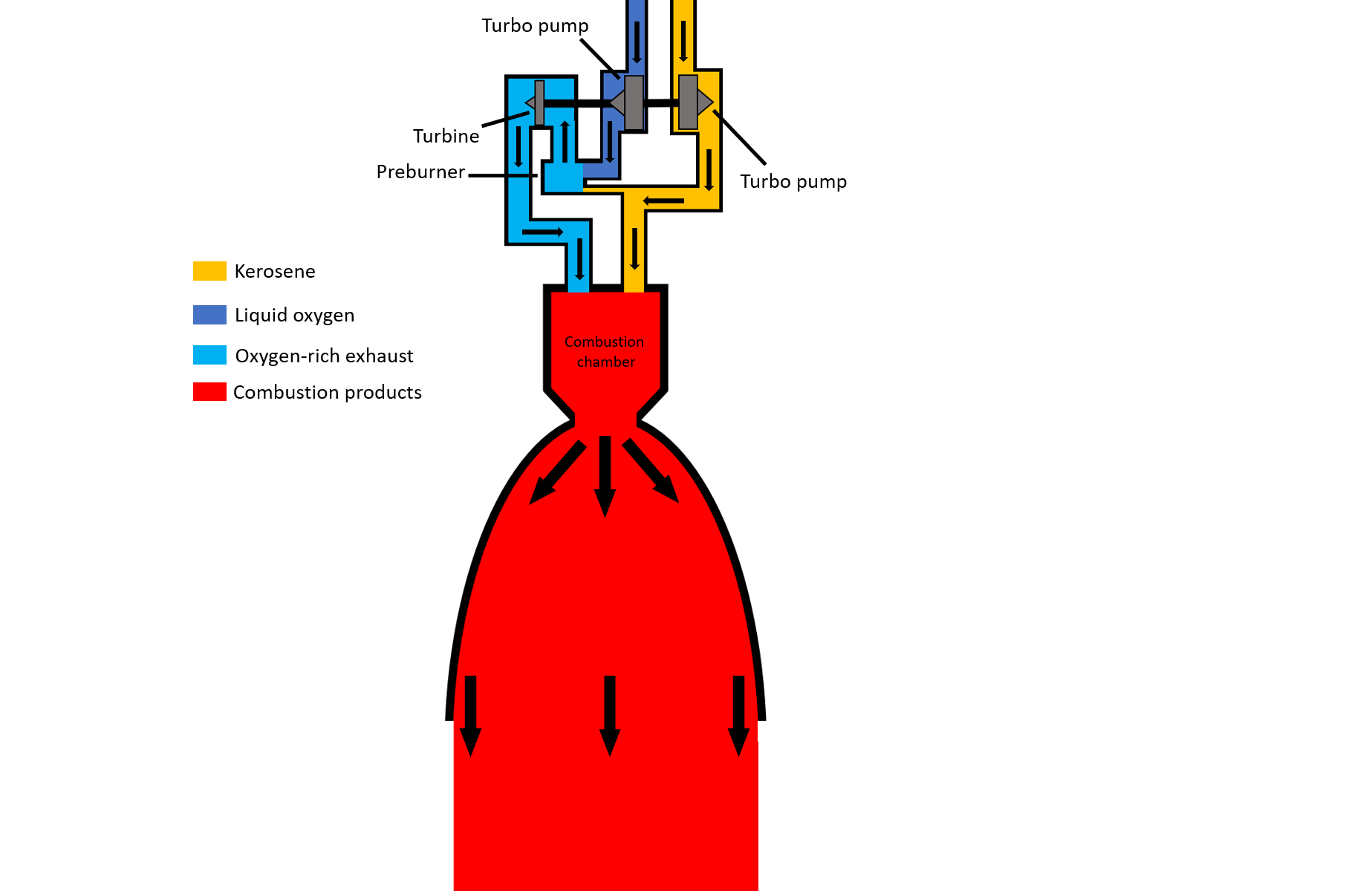
Simplified diagram of the NK-33 engine

The NK-33 series engines were high-pressure, regeneratively cooled, oxygen-rich staged combustion cycle bipropellant rocket engines. Their turbopumps require subcooled liquid oxygen (LOX) to cool the bearings. The NK-33's oxygen-rich closed-cycle design directs exhaust from the auxiliary engines into the main combustion chamber. In this configuration, fully heated liquid oxygen flows through the pre-burner before entering the main chamber. However, the extremely hot oxygen-rich mixture posed a significant engineering challenge. A key issue was the need for hot, high-pressure oxygen to flow throughout the engine, which would cause bare metal surfaces to oxidize rapidly. The Soviets overcame this by applying an inert enamel coating to all metal surfaces exposed to the hot oxygen.

This technological complexity and the resources required to address it deterred American engineers from pursuing oxidizer-rich staged combustion until much later. The United States did not explore oxygen-rich kerosene combustion technologies until the Integrated Powerhead Demonstrator project in the early 2000s.

The NK-33 engine is renowned for its exceptional thrust-to-weight ratio, one of the highest among Earth-launchable rocket engines. It has been surpassed only in recent years by the RD-253 from NPO Energomash and the Merlin 1D, Raptor 2, and Raptor 3 engines from SpaceX. The NK-43, a derivative optimized for upper-stage use, features a longer nozzle designed for operation in vacuum environments. This design increases its thrust and specific impulse but makes the engine longer and heavier, resulting in a thrust-to-weight ratio of approximately 120:1.

The NK-33 and NK-43 engines evolved from the earlier NK-15 and NK-15V engines, respectively, which powered the original N1 launch vehicle. Key upgrades included simplified pneumatic and hydraulic systems, advanced controls, enhanced turbopumps, an improved combustion chamber, fewer interfaces employing pyrotechnic devices, and modified interfaces to facilitate replacement of parts during refurbishment.

The oxygen-rich combustion technology developed for the NK-15 and refined in the NK-33 laid the groundwork for many of the most successful rocket engines in Soviet and Russian history. These include the RD-170, RD-180 and RD-191. While these engines share the oxygen-rich staged combustion cycle, they are not directly related to the NK-33.

== History ==
=== N1 ===
The N1 launcher originally utilized NK-15 engines for its first stage and a high-altitude variant, the NK-15V, for its second stage. The Soviets attempted to launch the N1 four times, but each attempt ended in failure, including one catastrophic explosion. By the time of the fourth failure, the Moon race was already lost. However, Soviet space program managers hoped a second-generation vehicle, dubbed the N1F, could support their ambitions to construct the proposed Zvezda Moon base. Kuznetsov refined his engine designs for the N1F, creating the improved NK-33 and NK-43 engines.

Despite these advancements, other Soviet space leaders prioritized the Energia rocket as the nation's heavy launcher, and the N1 program was ultimately canceled before an N1F could reach the launch pad. At the time of cancellation, two flight-ready N1Fs equipped with 30 NK-33 engines each in their Block A stages were complete.

When the N1 program was shut down, the Soviet government ordered all related materials and documentation to be destroyed to conceal the USSR's failed Moon program. Officially, the N1 project was dismissed as a mere "paper project" to mislead the United States into believing a Moon race was underway. This cover story persisted until the era of glasnost, when surviving hardware from the program was publicly displayed.

However, a bureaucratic decision spared the destruction of over 60 NK-33 engines, including those from the two completed Block A stages and additional spares. These engines were stored in a warehouse and largely forgotten until their existence became known to engineers in the United States nearly 30 years later.

=== Sale of engines to Aerojet ===
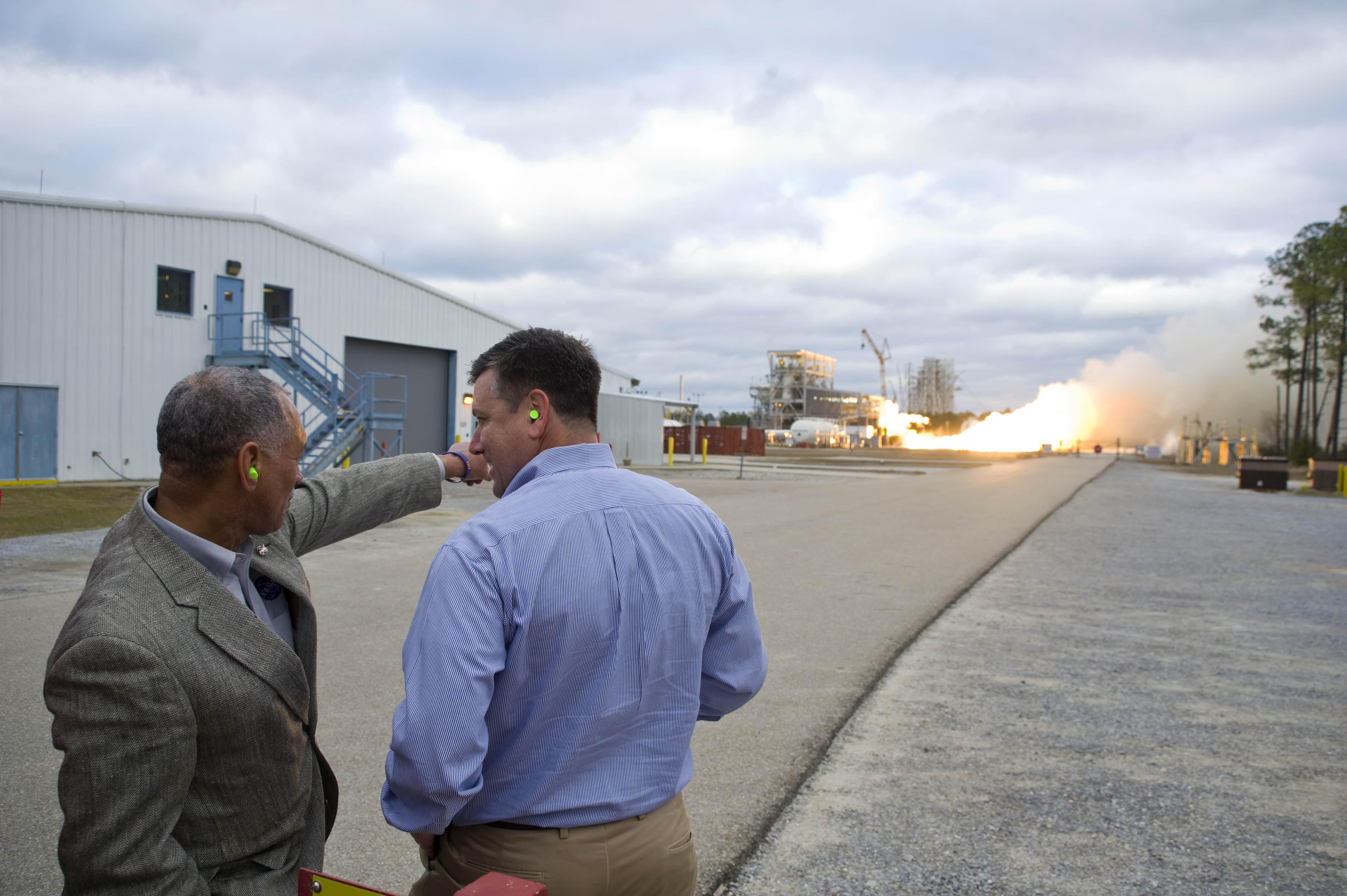
NASA Administrator Charles Bolden (left) and Stennis Space Center Director Patrick Scheuermann view a test firing of the first Aerojet AJ26 engine.

About 60 engines survived in the "Forest of Engines", as described by engineers on a trip to the warehouse. In the mid-1990s, Russia sold 36 engines to Aerojet at a per engine cost of US$1,100,000 (equivalent to $2,324,000 in 2025), shipping them to the company facility in Sacramento, California. Aerojet conducted the first test fire of a NK-33 engine in nearly 30 years on a test stand in Sacramento, during the test, the engine hit its specifications.

After the success of the test, Aerojet began updating and refurbishing the NK-33 engines they had purchased, and began marketing them to customers. They would rename their modified NK-33 engines the AJ26-58, AJ-26-59 and AJ26-62, and NK-43 engines the AJ26-60.

=== Kistler K-1 ===
Rocketplane Kistler (RpK), designed their K-1 rocket around three NK-33s and a NK-43. On 18 August 2006, NASA announced that RpK had been chosen to develop Commercial Orbital Transportation Services for the International Space Station. The plan called for demonstration flights between 2008 and 2010. RpK would have received up to $207 million if they met all NASA milestones, but on 7 September 2007, NASA issued a default letter, warning that it would terminate the COTS agreement with RpK because the company had not met several contract milestones.

=== Antares ===
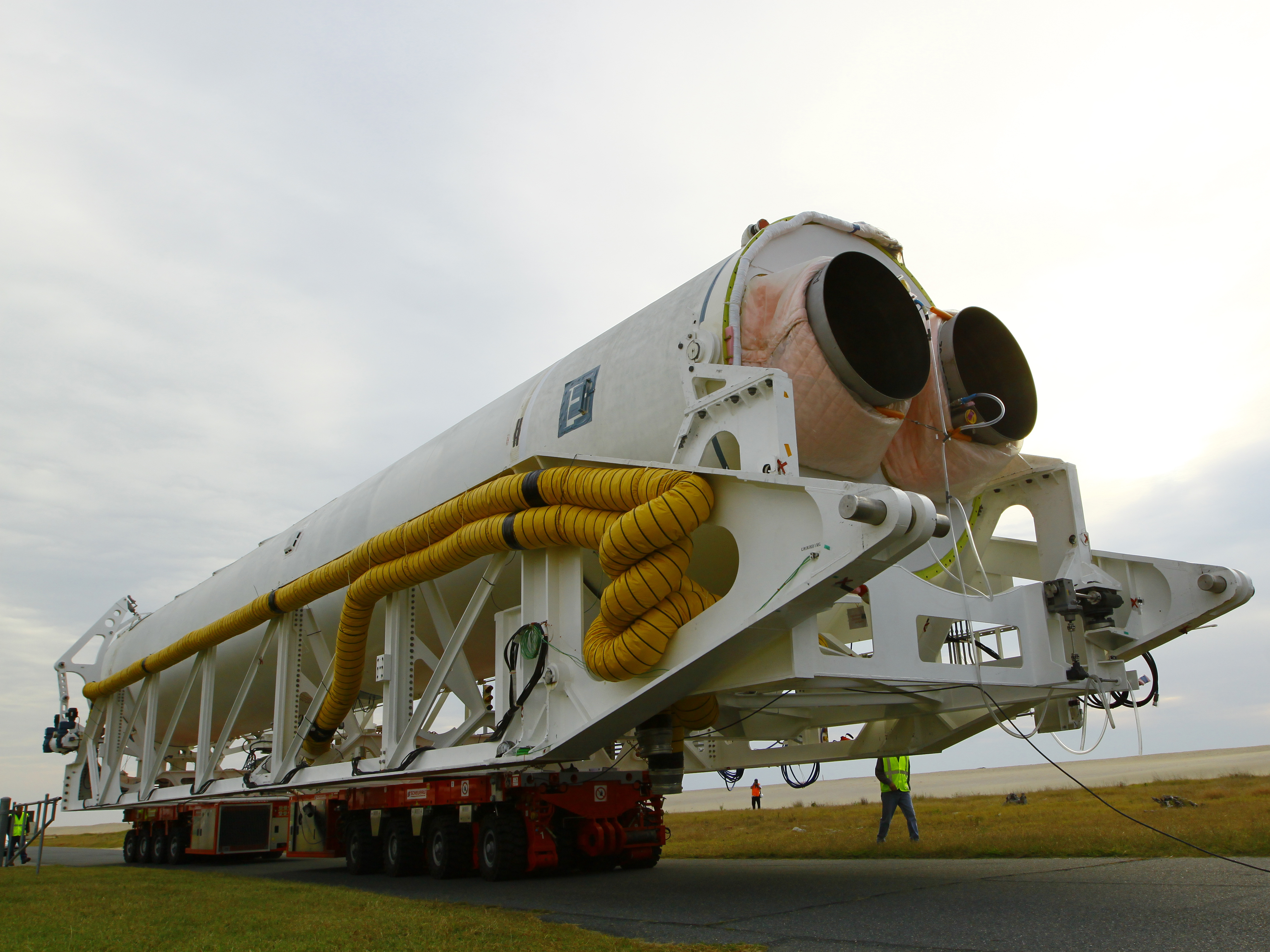
An Antares 100 rocket being rolled out for testing, showing the two NK-33 engines

The initial version of the Orbital Sciences Antares light-to-medium-lift launcher had two modified NK-33 in the first stage, a solid Castor 30-based second stage and an optional solid or hypergolic third stage. The NK-33s were imported from Russia to the United States, modified, and re-designated as Aerojet AJ26s. This involved removing some electrical harnessing, adding U.S. electronics, qualifying it for U.S. propellants, and modifying the steering system.

In 2010 stockpiled NK-33 engines were successfully tested for use by the Orbital Sciences Antares light-to-medium-lift launcher. The Antares rocket was successfully launched from NASA's Wallops Flight Facility on 21 April 2013. This marked the first successful launch of the NK-33 heritage engines built in early 1970s.

Aerojet agreed to recondition sufficient NK-33s to serve Orbital's 16-flight NASA Commercial Resupply Services contract. Beyond that, it had a stockpile of 23 1960s- and 1970s-era engines. Kuznetsov no longer manufactures the engines, so Orbital sought to buy RD-180 engines. Because NPO Energomash's contract with United Launch Alliance prevented this, Orbital sued ULA, alleging anti-trust violations. Aerojet offered to work with Kuznetsov to restart production of new NK-33 engines, to assure Orbital of an ongoing supply. However, manufacturing defects in the engine's liquid-oxygen turbopump and design flaws in the hydraulic balance assembly and thrust bearings were proposed as two possible causes of the 2014 Antares launch failure. As announced on 5 November 2014, Orbital decided to drop the AJ-26 first stage from the Antares and source an alternative engine. On 17 December 2014, Orbital Sciences announced that it would use the NPO Energomash RD-181 on second-generation Antares launch vehicles and had contracted directly with NPO Energomash for up to 60 RD-181 engines. Two engines are used on the first stage of the Antares 100-series.

=== Soyuz-2.1v ===
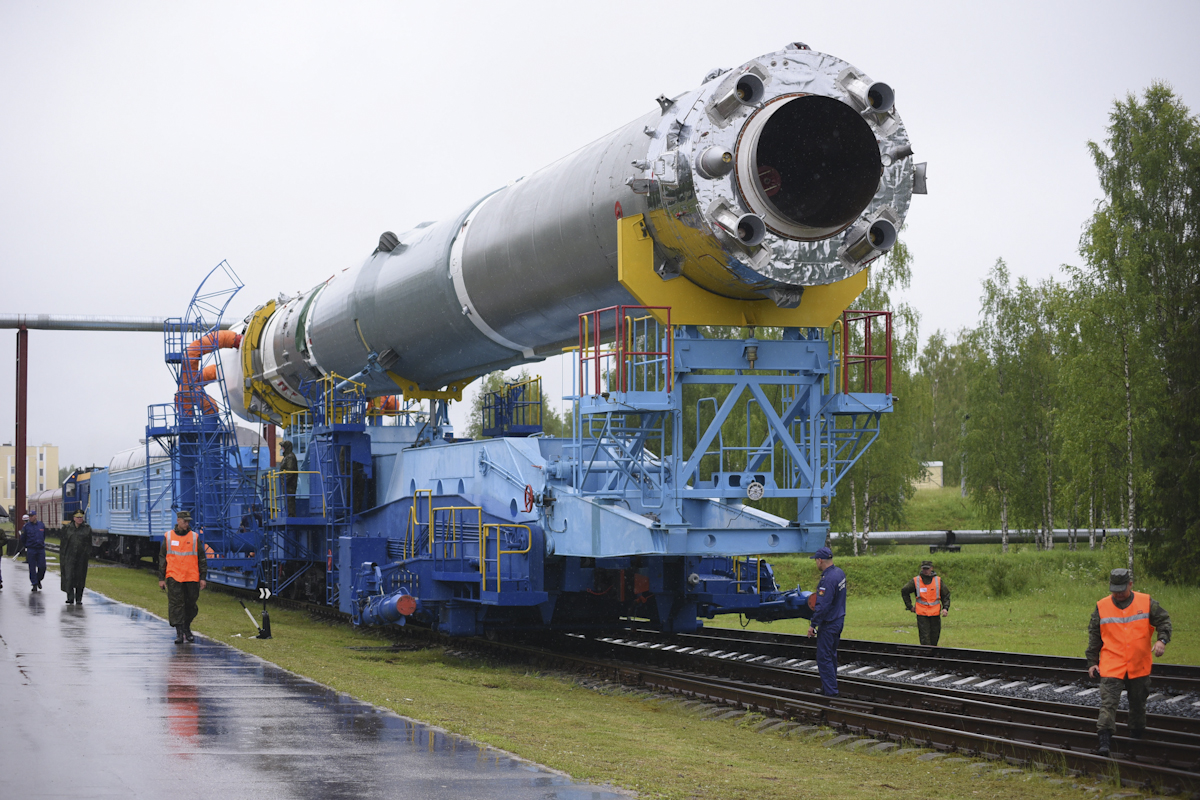
A Soyuz-2.1v rocket being rolled out to the launch pad, showing its single NK-33 engine

In the early 2010s, the Soyuz launch vehicle family was retrofitted with the NK-33 engine. This upgrade leveraged the engine's lower weight and greater efficiency to enhance payload capacity, while its simpler design and the use of surplus hardware potentially reduced costs. RKTs Progress integrated the NK-33 into the first stage of the small-lift Soyuz variant, the Soyuz-2.1v. On the rocket, a single NK-33 engine replaced the Soyuz's central RD-108 engine, and the four boosters of the first stage were omitted.

The NK-33A, specifically modified for the Soyuz-2.1v, underwent a successful hot-fire test on 15 January 2013, following a series of cold-fire and systems tests of the fully assembled rocket conducted in 2011 and 2012. The rocket completed its maiden flight on 28 December 2013.

== Versions ==
During the years there have been many versions of this engine:

- NK-15 (GRAU index 11D51): Initial version for the N1 first stage.
- NK-15V (GRAU index 11D52): Optimized for vacuum operation, used on the N1 second stage.
- NK-33 (GRAU index 11D111): Improved version of NK-15 for the N1F first stage, never flown.
- NK-43 (GRAU index 11D112): Improved version of NK-15V optimized for vacuum operation, used on the N1F second stage, never flown.
- AJ26-58: NK-33 modified by Aerojet Rocketdyne. Planned to be used on the Kistler K-1, but the project was cancelled and the engine was never flown.
- AJ26-59: NK-33 modified by Aerojet Rocketdyne. Planned to be used on the Kistler K-1, but the project was cancelled and the engine was never flown.
- AJ26-62: NK-33 modified by Aerojet Rocketdyne with additional gimbal mechanism. Used on the Antares 100-series first stage.
- NK-33A (GRAU index 14D15): Refurbished NK-33 used on the Soyuz-2.1v first stage.

== Gallery ==
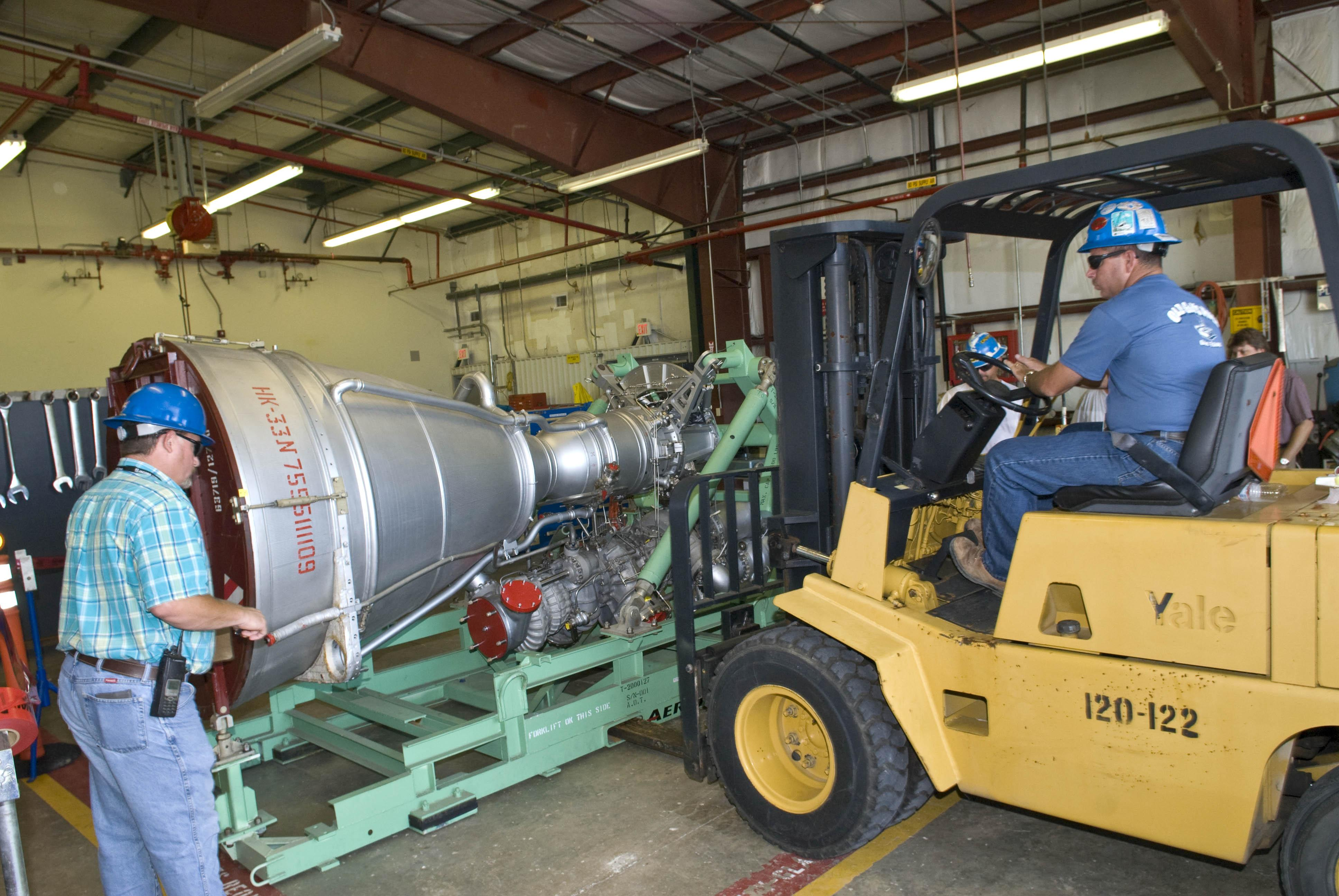
An Aerojet AJ26 rocket engine being delivered to the John C. Stennis Space Center.

== See also ==
- Comparison of orbital rocket engines
