= BF-20 =

Rocket engine

- Country of origin: China
- Manufacturer: LandSpace
- Status: In development

Liquid-fuel engine
- Propellant: LOX / CH_{4}
- Mixture ratio: 3.6 (±8%) (adjustable)
- Cycle: Full-flow staged combustion

Performance
- Thrust, vacuum: 2,366 kilonewtons (532,000 lbf)
- Thrust, sea-level: 2,200 kilonewtons (490,000 lbf)
- Throttle range: 40%~120%
- Chamber pressure: 26 MPa (3,800 psi)
- Specific impulse, vacuum: 353.16s
- Specific impulse, sea-level: 328.47s

Used in
- ZQ-3

The BF-20 (Chinese: 蓝焱-20; pinyin: Lányàn-20, lit. Blue Flame 20) is a full-flow staged combustion cycle rocket engine burning liquid methane and liquid oxygen under development by LandSpace.

== Design ==
The engine uses two preburners: a fuel-rich preburner drives the fuel pump, while an oxygen-rich preburner drives the oxidizer pump. The exhaust from both preburners enters the main combustion chamber.

== History ==
In 2021, LandSpace initiated the development of BF-20 for its Zhuque-3 rocket. By 2024, the technical design of the engine had been completed, with a hot-fire test planned for 2025 and flight readiness targeted for 2027.

The engine conducted its first full-system test in May 2025. By September 2025, it had completed thirty test firings, with thrust limited to 110 tons. In March 2026, LandSpace announced that the engine had completed a full-system long-duration test and over one hundred full-system ignition tests in total.
