= Tupolev Tu-125 =

Bomber project

Tu-125

General information
- Type: Supersonic medium bomber
- National origin: USSR
- Manufacturer: Tupolev

The Tupolev Tu-125 was an unrealized project to develop a new long-range supersonic bomber for the Soviet Air Force. Development commenced in 1958 to replace the newest Tu-22. The "Tu-125" designation was an internal one used by the Tupolev design bureau. Since the aircraft was never built, it never received a military designation.

A canard design was chosen for the aircraft, featuring a delta planform for the wing and stabilizer. Two turbojets (Kuznetsov NK-6 or NK-10 (230–240 kN)) were to be installed in nacelles under the wings. A four-turbojet version, powered by Tumansky R-15 B-300s in two nacelles also was considered. The fuselage and wings made from titanium and aluminium alloys.

In September 1962, the Soviet Air Force rejected the project and it was stopped. No aircraft were built.

== Specifications (Tu-125 Tumansky engines – estimated) ==
General characteristics

- Length: 41.40 m (135 ft 10 in)
- Wingspan: 22.20 m (72 ft 10 in)
- Height: 9.55 m (31 ft 4 in)
- Wing area: 226.0 m^{2} (2,433 sq ft)
- Gross weight: 110,000 kg (242,508 lb)
- Powerplant: 4 × Tumansky R-15B-300 , 110 kN (25,000 lbf) thrust each

Performance

- Maximum speed: 3,500 km/h (2,200 mph, 1,900 kn)
- Range: 7,000 km (4,300 mi, 3,800 nmi)
- Service ceiling: 25,000 m (82,000 ft)
- Wing loading: 487 kg/m^{2} (100 lb/sq ft)
- Thrust/weight: 0.4076

Armament

- Missiles: 1 × Raduga Kh-22 nuclear missile

== See also ==
Aircraft of comparable role, configuration, and era

- XB-70 Valkyrie
- Sukhoi T-4
