= Kuznetsov NK-6 =

1950s Soviet/Russian turbofan aircraft engine

NK-6
- Type: Turbofan
- National origin: Soviet Union
- Manufacturer: Kuznetsov Design Bureau
- First run: May 1958

The Kuznetsov NK-6 was a low-bypass afterburning turbofan engine, designed by the Kuznetsov Design Bureau.

== Development ==
Development of the NK-6 started in 1955 at the Kuznetsov Design Bureau. It was the first afterburning by-pass engine made in the Soviet Union. With a maximum thrust of 216 kN (49,000 lbf), it was the most powerful jet engine in the world in the early 1960s. Despite this fact, development of the NK-6 was halted in July 1963. The accumulated experience of the NK-6 project was subsequently used in the development of the NK-144.

A modified version of this engine, the NK-7, was intended for the Soviet Navy and had a takeoff thrust of 216 kN (49,000 lbf).

== Applications ==
- Project "106" (proposed)
- Tupolev Tu-95LL (testbed)
- Tupolev Tu-123 (proposed)
- Tupolev Tu-125 (proposed)
- Tupolev Tu-135 (proposed)

== Specifications (NK-6) ==
Data from Otechestvennaya aviatsionno-kosmicheskaya tekhnika - SAMARSKIY NTK

==== General characteristics ====
- Type: Two-spool low-bypass afterburning turbofan
- Length: 4,810 mm (189 in)
- Diameter: 1,750 mm (69 in)
- Dry weight: 3,200 kg (7,100 lb)

==== Components ====
- Compressor: 4-stage LP, 6-stage HP
- Combustors: Annular multi-nozzle combustion chamber
- Turbine: 1-stage HP, 2-stage LP

==== Performance ====
- Maximum thrust:
  - 216 kN (49,000 lbf) at takeoff
  - 196.2 kN (44,100 lbf) in cruise with afterburner
  - 34.3 kN (7,700 lbf) in cruise without afterburner
- Overall pressure ratio: 13.4 at takeoff
- Bypass ratio: 1.79
- Air mass flow: 343 kg/s (760 lb/s)
- Turbine inlet temperature: 1,400 K (1,130 °C; 2,060 °F)
- Specific fuel consumption:
  - 183.6 kg/(kN⋅h) at takeoff
  - 200 kg/(kN⋅h) in cruise with afterburner
  - 87.7 kg/(kN⋅h) in cruise without afterburner

== See also ==
Comparable engines

- Kuznetsov NK-22

Related lists

- List of aircraft engines
