= Tupolev Samolyot 135 =

Soviet supersonic strategic bomber

Samolyot 135

General information
- Type: strategic bomber
- National origin: Soviet Union
- Manufacturer: Tupolev
- Status: Project only

The Tupolev Samolyot 135 was a designation that was used for two different strategic bomber projects in the Soviet Union in the late 1950s and early 1960s, neither of which progressed beyond the drawing board.

== Design and development ==
The first, proposed in 1958, was for a Tupolev Tu-95 derivative carrying a long-range cruise-missile, to be based on the Tsybin RS (S-30), Tupolev Samolyot 100 or Tupolev Samolyot 113 missiles. The combination was estimated to have a total range of approximately 4,000 km (2,500 mi).

Two years later the second iteration of '135' was envisioned as a supersonic interdiction bomber powered by a variety of engines in many configurations, including as a nuclear-powered bomber. The design settled to a canard delta, similar to the North American XB-70A Valkyrie, with paired Kuznetsov NK-6 turbofan engine nacelles under each wing and a large single fin. Weapons would largely have been missiles, as designed, for maritime interdiction as well as long-range interdiction of enemy logistics. The design was constantly evolving and gave Tupolev valuable experience which would assist in the later design of the Tupolev Tu-22M and Tupolev Tu-160 bombers, as well as the Tupolev Tu-144 supersonic airliner, which was code-named Tu-135P.

Further development of the '135 was suspended when the Sukhoi T-4 became the favoured outcome of the design efforts in the early 1960s, as well as high estimated cost of the '135'. Variants that were studied included: the 135K maritime strike / interdiction; '135P' supersonic transport (SST); a reconnaissance variant with cameras and ELINT equipment.

== Specifications (estimated) ==
Data from , OKB Tupolev

General characteristics

- Crew: 4
- Length: 50.7 m (166 ft 4 in)
- Wingspan: 34.8 m (114 ft 2 in)
- Height: 10.7 m (35 ft 1 in)
- Wing area: 417 m^{2} (4,490 sq ft)
- Gross weight: 175,000 kg (385,809 lb)
- Max takeoff weight: 205,000 kg (451,948 lb)
- Powerplant: 4 × DTRD NC-6 turbofan engines, 105 kN (23,500 lbf) with afterburner

Performance

- Maximum speed: 3,000 km/h (1,900 mph, 1,600 kn)
- Cruise speed: 2,650 km/h (1,650 mph, 1,430 kn)
- Range: 7,800 km (4,800 mi, 4,200 nmi) to 8,000 km (5,000 mi) at supersonic speeds andhigh altitude

6,000 km (3,700 mi) at low altitudes

- Service ceiling: 19,000 m (62,000 ft) to 22,000 m (72,000 ft)

Armament

- Missiles: alternative loads
- 4-6 x Kh-22
- 2-4 x Kh-45
- 2-4-x Ballistic missiles
- 4-6 x Air-to-air missiles
