= NK-9 =

Rocket engine

- Country of origin: Soviet Union
- Date: 1959
- Designer: Kuznetsov Design Bureau
- Application: 1st/2nd-stage engine
- Successor: NK-15

Liquid-fuel engine
- Propellant: LOX / RG-1
- Cycle: Oxidiser-rich Staged combustion
- Pumps: Turbopump

Performance
- Thrust, vacuum: 441 kN (99,000 lb_{f})
- Thrust, sea-level: 360 kN (81,000 lb_{f})
- Chamber pressure: 10.9 MPa (1,580 psi)
- Specific impulse, vacuum: 327 s (3.21 km/s)
- Specific impulse, sea-level: 280 s (2.7 km/s)

The NK-9 was a rocket engine designed and built in 1959 by the Kuznetsov Design Bureau. The NK designation was derived from the initials of chief designer Nikolay Kuznetsov. It was intended for the R-9 Desna, but lost this bid to the RD-111. It was the world's first oxygen-kerosene engine in the 1 MN+ thrust class to use a closed-cycle design with staged combustion of generator gas in the combustion chamber. For the second stage of this missile, the NK-9V engine was developed, with testing starting in September 1962. In the early 1960s, the NK-19 was created, for use on an upgraded R-9 first stage, along with the NK-21. Both were cancelled. It was later developed into the NK-31, which was intended to be used on variants of the N-1, which were also cancelled.
