= NK-15 =

Soviet rocket engine design

- Country of origin: Soviet Union
- Date: 1960s
- Designer: Kuznetsov Design Bureau
- Application: 1st/2nd-stage engine
- Predecessor: NK-9
- Successor: NK-33

Liquid-fuel engine
- Propellant: LOX / RG-1
- Mixture ratio: 2.52:1 (oxidizer:fuel)
- Cycle: Staged combustion
- Pumps: Turbopump

Performance
- Thrust, vacuum: 1,544 kN (347,000 lb_{f})
- Thrust, sea-level: 1,526 kN (343,000 lb_{f})
- Throttle range: 50–105%
- Thrust-to-weight ratio: 126.22:1
- Chamber pressure: 7.85 MPa (1,139 psi)
- Specific impulse, vacuum: 318 s (3.12 km/s)
- Specific impulse, sea-level: 297 s (2.91 km/s)

Dimensions
- Length: 2.7 m (8 ft 10 in)
- Diameter: 1.5 m (4 ft 11 in)
- Dry mass: 1,247 kg (2,749 lb)

The NK-15 (GRAU index: 11D51) was a rocket engine designed and built in the late 1960s by the Kuznetsov Design Bureau. The NK designation was derived from the initials of chief designer Nikolay Kuznetsov. The NK-15 was among the most powerful LOX/kerosene rocket engines when it was built, with a high specific impulse and low structural mass. It was intended for the ill-fated Soviet N-1 Moon rocket. A unique part of this engine was its pyrotechnic valves, which could not be closed after firing.

== History ==
The engine equipped the N1 rocket - the first two launch attempts failed due to this engine. Its successor, the NK-33 was to be used on the N1F, an upgraded version of the N1, but the program was cancelled.

== Versions ==
- NK-15V (GRAU index: 11D52): modified NK-15 optimized for vacuum operation, used on the second stage of the N1.

== See also ==
- Comparison of orbital rocket engines
