= Kuznetsov TV-022 =

1940s Soviet turboprop aircraft engine

TV-022
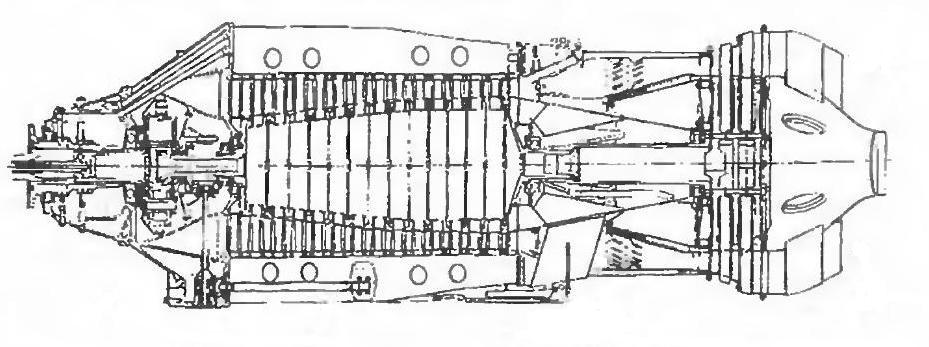
- A hand-drawn cutaway view of the TV-022
- Type: Turboprop
- National origin: Soviet Union
- Manufacturer: Kuybyshev Engine Design Bureau
- First run: June 1949
- Developed from: Junkers Jumo 022
- Developed into: TV-2

The Kuznetsov TV-022 was the first Soviet turboprop engine, designed by the Kuybyshev Engine Design Bureau.

== Development ==
Development of the TV-022 began in 1947 at the State Union Experimental Plant No. 2 near Kuybyshev. A team of both Soviet and deported German engineers worked on the project.

The TV-022 was based on the uncompleted Junkers Jumo 022 turboprop designed by Junkers during the later stages of World War II.

Factory tests of the TV-022 took place in June 1949 and state tests where passed in October 1950. The TV-022 featured a reduction gearbox (i=0.145) for two coaxial contra-rotating AB-41 propellers. The engine was started with a 50 kW "Rut" air starter.

Modifications to the TV-022 resulted in the TV-2, which had more power (6,250 hp). The TV-2 was then further modified into the NK-12.

== Specifications (TV-022) ==
Data from Otechestvennaya aviatsionno-kosmicheskaya tekhnika - SAMARSKIY NTK, and engine.aviaport.ru

==== General characteristics ====
- Type: Turboprop engine
- Length: 4,170 mm (164 in) without propellers
- Diameter: 1,050 mm (41 in) without propellers
- Dry weight: 1,700 kg (3,700 lb)

==== Components ====
- Compressor: 14-stage compressor
- Combustors: 12 annular combustion chambers made of heat resistant steel (EI417)
- Turbine: 3-stage turbine, of which only the first and second stages are cooled

==== Performance ====
- Maximum power output:
  - 5,000 hp (3,700 kW); at takeoff
  - 2,200 hp (1,600 kW); in cruise
- Overall pressure ratio: 5.6
- Air mass flow: 30 kg/s (66 lb/s)
- Turbine inlet temperature: 1,120 K (850 °C; 1,560 °F)
- Specific fuel consumption: 0.21 kg/(hp⋅h)

== See also ==
Comparable engines

- Kuznetsov NK-12

Related lists

- List of aircraft engines
