= Integrated Powerhead Demonstrator =

U.S. Air Force project in the 1990s and early 2000s

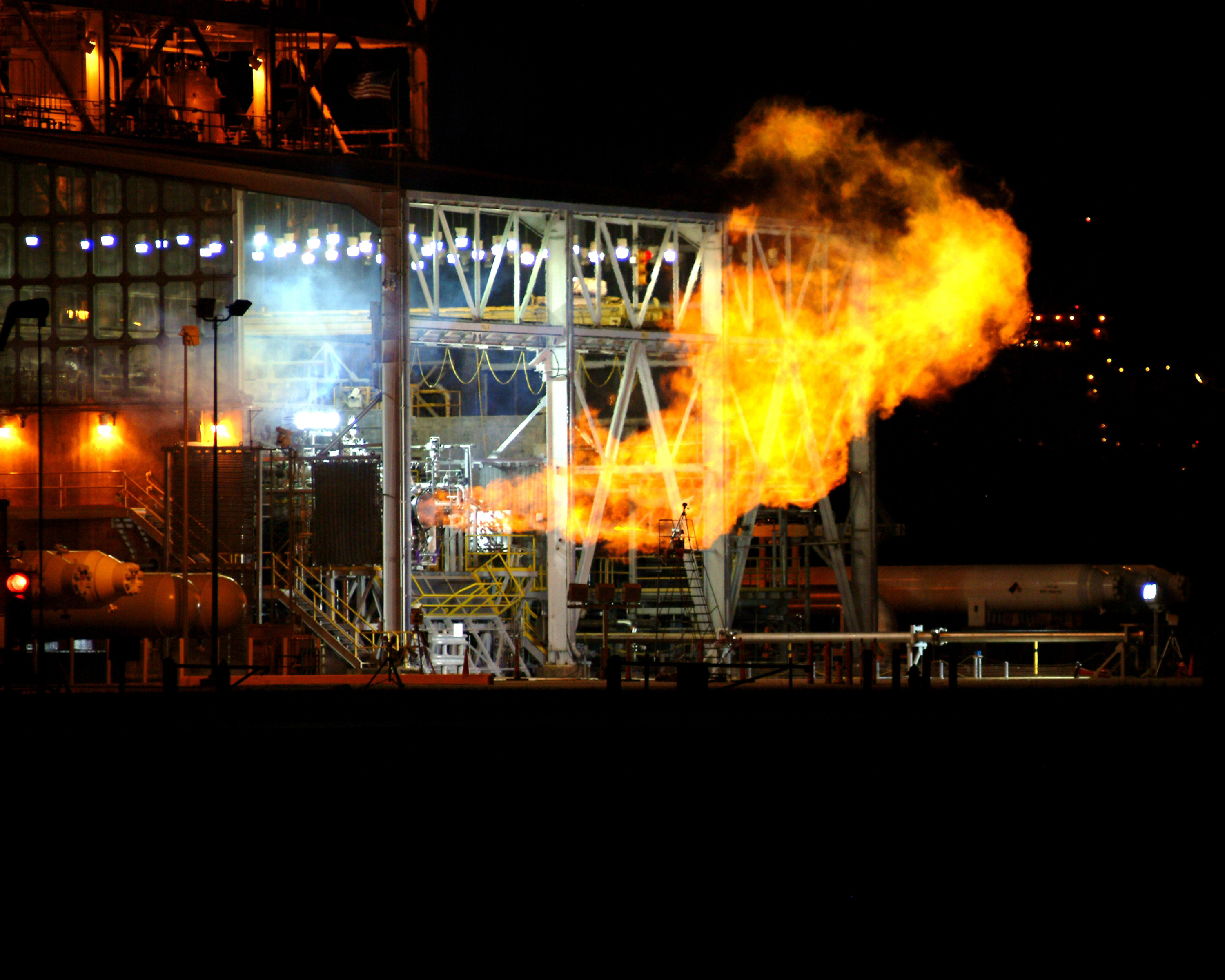
The Integrated Powerhead Demonstrator during testing in 2005

The integrated powerhead demonstrator (IPD) was a U.S. Air Force project in the 1990s and early 2000s run by NASA and the Air Force Research Laboratory (AFRL) to develop a new rocket engine front-end ("powerhead", sometimes also termed a powerpack) that would utilize a full flow staged combustion cycle (FFSC). The prime contractors were Rocketdyne and Aerojet.

The long-term design goal was to apply the advantages of FFSC to create a reusable engine with improved life, reliability and performance. The powerhead demonstrator project was to develop a demonstrator design of what could become the front-end for a future engine development project. No subsequent funding was made available by public policymakers, so no full engine design was ever completed.

The turbines were also planned to feature hydrostatic bearings instead of the traditional ball bearings.

== History ==
On July 19, 2006 Rocketdyne announced that the demonstrator engine front-end had been operated at full capacity.

According to NASA, the Integrated Powerhead Demonstrator project was the first of three potential phases of the Integrated High Payoff Rocket Propulsion Technology Program, which was aimed at demonstrating technologies that double the capability of state-of-the-art cryogenic booster engines. The project's goal in 2005 was to develop a full-flow, hydrogen-fueled, staged combustion rocket engine.

In 2007, Northrop Grumman announced it had received an AFRL contract to design and test a turbopump for liquid hydrogen propellants that could be used for these engines.

In 2013, NASA announced in a press release that the powerhead demo had achieved steady test performance at 100% power for the first time and had achieved 300 seconds of operation across 26 tests.

Future engine development work beyond the powerhead demo was never funded by the US government, and neither Rocketdyne—nor later Aerojet Rocketdyne after a 2013 merger—chose to pursue such development with their own or other private funding.
