= Kuznetsov NK-14 =

Soviet aircraft engine design study

The Kuznetsov NK-14A was an onboard nuclear-powered engine which was made to be used on the Tupolev Tu-119 nuclear-powered aircraft, designed and built by the Soviet Kuznetsov Design Bureau. The design of the plane was based on a modified Tupolev Tu-95 and would be fitted with two Kuznetsov NK-14A nuclear-fuelled engines inboard fed with heat from a fuselage mounted reactor and two Kerosene-fed Kuznetsov NK-12 turboprops outboard.

Development was suspended with the cancellation of the Tu-119, but flight trials would have been made initially fitted to the inboard nacelles of the Tu-119 prototype.
