= Kuznetsov NK-22 =

1960s Soviet/Russian turbofan aircraft engine

NK-22
- Type: Turbofan
- National origin: Soviet Union
- Manufacturer: Kuznetsov Design Bureau
- First run: April 1968
- Major applications: Tupolev Tu-22M
- Developed from: NK-144
- Developed into: NK-23

The Kuznetsov NK-22 is an afterburning turbofan engine, designed by the Kuznetsov Design Bureau.

== Development ==
In April 1967, the Kuznetsov Design Bureau accepted an official request to create a new engine that would later be designated as the NK-22. The design of the NK-22 was based on the NK-144 engine used on the Tupolev Tu-144 SST.

The first specimen of the engine was completed on April 10, 1968 and the first factory tests where passed in the same month. State tests took place in October 1970. The engines where later installed on Tu-22M0, M1, and M2 bombers. Serial production of the NK-22 started in 1969 and was terminated in 1984.

A modernised version of the NK-22, the NK-23, first ran in July 1976 and was tested in flight on a Tupolev Tu-22M2 bomber. Despite having more thrust (220 kN) than its predecessor, the NK-23 was not put into serial production.

== Applications ==
- Tupolev Tu-22M0, M1 and M2

== Specifications (NK-22) ==
Data from airwar.ru and leteckemotory.cz

==== General characteristics ====
- Type: Two-spool low-bypass afterburning turbofan
- Length: 5,200 mm (200 in)
- Diameter: 1,500 mm (59 in)
- Dry weight:

==== Components ====
- Compressor: 12-stage axial compressor
- Combustors: Annular multi-nozzle combustion chamber
- Turbine: 3-stage turbine
- Fuel type: T-7 or RT kerosene type fuel

==== Performance ====
- Maximum thrust:
  - 215.76 kN (48,500 lbf) with full afterburner
  - 158.9 kN (35,700 lbf) in cruise
- Overall pressure ratio: 14.75
- Bypass ratio: 0.6
- Turbine inlet temperature: 1,087 °C (1,989 °F)
- Specific fuel consumption: 1.95 kg/(kgf⋅h) with full afterburner

== See also ==
Comparable engines

- Kuznetsov NK-25

Related lists

- List of aircraft engines
