= Global Rocket 1 =

Soviet cold war missile

The Global Rocket 1 (GR-1; Russian: Глобальная ракета, ГР-1, romanized: Globalnaya raketa) was a Fractional Orbital Bombardment System (FOBS) intercontinental ballistic missile (ICBM) developed but not deployed by the Soviet Union during the Cold War.

== Development ==
In 1961, faced with the prospect of development in the United States of an anti-ballistic missile (ABM) system to intercept conventional ICBMs, the Soviet Union began development of a fractional orbital bombardment system (FOBS) to defeat these interceptors. Soviet Chief Designer, Sergei Pavlovich Korolev designed the Global Rocket 1 (GR-1). The concept was to construct a missile that could be launched into low Earth orbit (150 km), from which a 1500 kg nuclear warhead equipped with a deorbit stage could be dropped to its targets in a non-ballistic manner and without giving away its target until final descent. This concept would allow for very little warning to the U.S. because the rocket would be able to approach the United States from any direction and avoid missile tracking radar by flying below its coverage. Not only could such a missile hit any point on Earth, but the enemy would also be uncertain when it would be deorbited onto target. The main disadvantage was lower accuracy of the warhead in comparison to an ICBM. Korolev insisted on sticking to the liquid oxygen/kerosene propellants of his R-9 Desna ICBM design, despite the military's preference for the more toxic but storable propellants used by other designers. The GR-1 was intended to utilize the launch pads of Korolev's R-9 Desna which was being phased out of service.

Korolev unofficially started work on the missile on 15 March 1962 based on a verbal go-ahead by Khrushchev. The draft project for the GR-1 was completed in May 1962, and a mock-up had already been built and drawings released to the production shop by the time the official resolution was issued on 24 September 1962. Test flights were scheduled to start in the third quarter of 1963. Further development of the GR-1 missile was halted in 1964 in preference of the orbital R-36 missile.

The GR-1 project was cancelled in 1964 citing engine delays, a fate which became permanent for all of the FOBS designs after the SALT II agreement of 1979. Even earlier, in 1972, the Anti-Ballistic Missile Treaty removed the primary reason for such a weapon.

== Operator ==
Soviet Union
The Soviets cancelled the GR-1 before it entered operational service with the Strategic Rocket Forces.

== Specifications ==
Global Rocket 1 (GR-1) Characteristics
Maximum Range	N/A - missile could in theory strike anywhere on Earth.
Number of Warheads	1
Warhead Yield	2,200 KT
Boost Propulsion	Liquid Oxygen/Kerosene
Cruise Engine	NK-9
Total Length	35.505 m
Missile Diameter	2.85 m
Launch Weight	116 t
Number of Stages	3

== See also ==
- List of missiles
