= Kuznetsov NK-32 =

1980s Soviet/Russian turbofan aircraft engine

NK-32
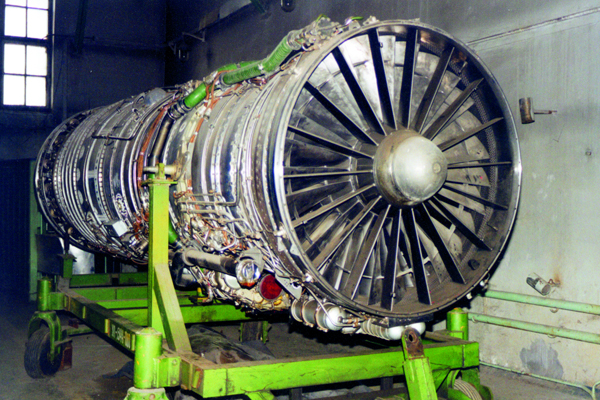
- Type: Turbofan
- National origin: Soviet Union/Russia
- Manufacturer: Kuznetsov Design Bureau
- Major applications: Tupolev Tu-160

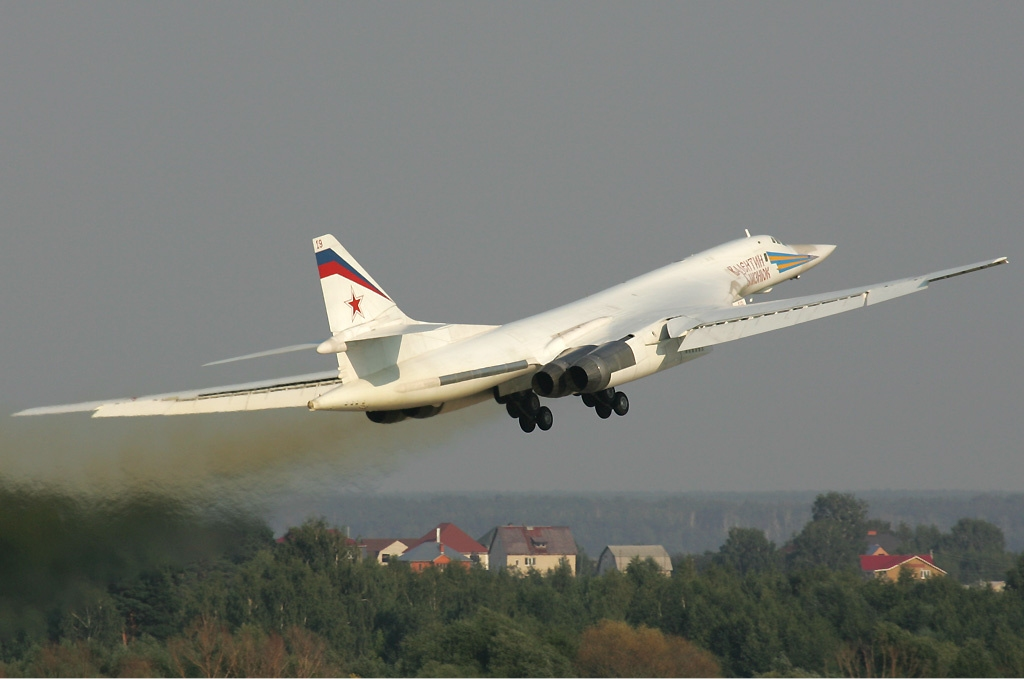
A Tupolev Tu-160 taking off with NK-32 engines.

The Kuznetsov NK-32 is an afterburning three-spool low bypass turbofan jet engine which powers the Tupolev Tu-160 supersonic bomber, and was fitted to the later model Tupolev Tu-144LL supersonic transport. It produces 245 kN (55,000 lb_{f}) of thrust in afterburner.

An upgraded variant known as NK-32 Tier 2 will be used in modernised Tu-160s, and a non-afterburning variant NK-65 will be used in the upcoming Russian stealth bomber, the Tupolev PAK DA.

The NK-65 and a geared high-bypass turbofan variant, the PD-30, with a thrust of 30,000 kilograms-force (290 kN; 66,000 lbf) has been proposed for use on new Russian wide-body airliners, as well as the upgraded Antonov An-124 Ruslan heavylifter.

== Applications ==
- Tupolev Tu-160
- Tupolev Tu-144LL
- Tupolev Tu-22M3M
- Yakovlev Yak-43
- PAK DA

== Specifications ==
==== General characteristics ====
- Type: Three-spool low-bypass afterburning turbofan
- Length: 6,000 mm (240 in)
- Diameter: 1,460 mm (57 in)
- Dry weight: 3,400 kg (7,500 lb)

==== Components ====
- Compressor: 3-stage LP (fan), 5-stage IP, 7-stage HP
- Combustors: annular
- Turbine: 1-stage HP, 1-stage IP, 2-stage LP

==== Performance ====
- Maximum thrust: Cruise thrust: 14 000 kgf (31,000 lbf, 137 kN) Afterburning thrust: 25 000 kgf (55,000 lbf, 245 kN)
- Overall pressure ratio: 28.4
- Bypass ratio: 1.4
- Turbine inlet temperature: 1630 K (1357 °C)
- Specific fuel consumption: (supersonic) 1.70 kg/kgf/hour (subsonic): 0.72-0.73 kg/kgf/hour
- Thrust-to-weight ratio: 7.35

== See also ==
Comparable engines

- General Electric F101

Related lists

- List of aircraft engines
