= Kuznetsov NK-144 =

1960s Soviet turbofan aircraft engine

NK-144
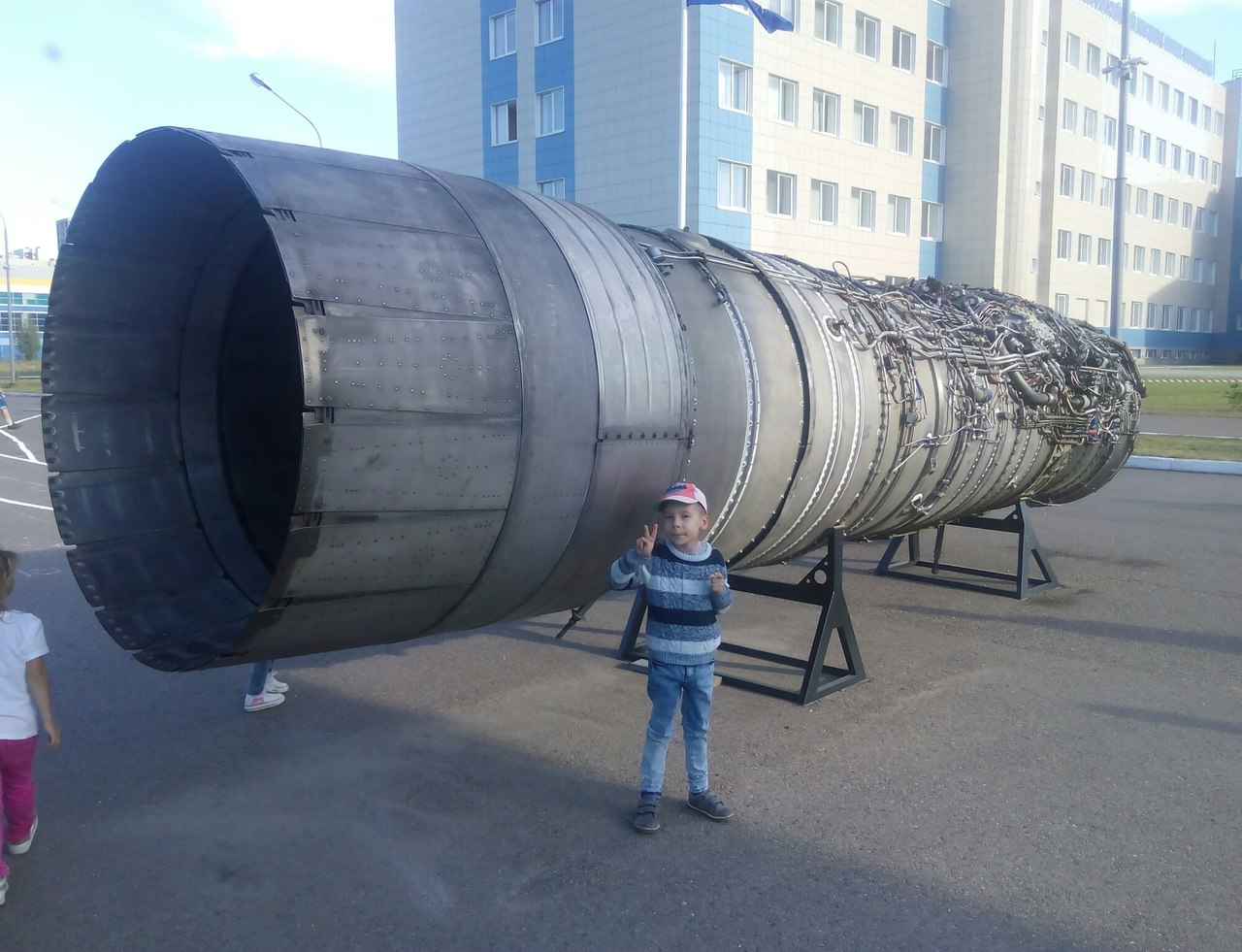
- NK-144 engine on a pedestal near the building of KAI in Kazan.
- Type: Turbofan
- National origin: Soviet Union
- Manufacturer: Kuznetsov Design Bureau
- First run: July 1964
- Major applications: Tupolev Tu-144
- Developed into: NK-22

The Kuznetsov NK-144 is an afterburning turbofan engine made by the Soviet Kuznetsov Design Bureau. Used on the early models of the Tupolev Tu-144 supersonic aircraft, it was very inefficient and was replaced with the Kolesov RD-36-51 turbojet engine.

== Specifications ==
Data from

==== General characteristics ====
- Type: Twin-spool afterburning turbofan
- Length:
- Diameter:
- Dry weight:

==== Components ====
- Compressor: axial

==== Performance ====
- Maximum thrust: 28,660 lbf (dry) 38,580 lbf (wet)

(127.40 kN 63,185 lbf to 171.2 kN

- Overall pressure ratio: 14.2
- Bypass ratio: 0.60
- Air mass flow: 551 lb/s
- Specific fuel consumption: 1.81 lb/lbf hour
