= Vladimir Myasishchev (engineer) =

Russian aerospace engineer

- Владимир Мясищев
- Born: Vladimir Mikhailovich Myasishchev; 28 September [O.S. 15 September] 1902; Yefremov, Voronezh Governorate, Russian Empire
- Died: 14 October 1978 (aged 76); Moscow, Russian SFSR, Soviet Union
- Education: Moscow State Technical University
- Known for: V. M. Myasishchev Experimental Design Bureau
- Awards: Hero of Socialist Labour (1956); Lenin Prize (1957); Orders of Lenin (three times); Order of Suvorov II degree Order of the October Revolution
- Scientific career
- Fields: aerospace

Vladimir Mikhailovich Myasishchev (Russian: Владимир Михайлович Мясищев; 28 September 1902 – 14 October 1978) was a Soviet aircraft designer, major general of Engineering (1944), Hero of Socialist Labour (1957), Doctor of Technical Sciences (1959), Honoured Scientist of the RSFSR (1972).

After his graduation from Moscow State Technical University in 1926, Myasishchev worked at the Tupolev Design Bureau and took part in constructing airplanes, such as Tupolev TB-1, Tupolev TB-3, and Tupolev ANT-20. As an assistant to Boris Lisunov, he traveled to the United States in 1937 to help translate the Douglas DC-3 drawings in preparation for the production of the Lisunov Li-2.

In 1938, Myasishchev became a victim of a repression campaign. While in confinement, he worked at NKVD's Central Design Bureau No. 29 (ЦКБ-29 НКВД) in Moscow under the guidance of Vladimir Petlyakov, designing the Pe-2 bomber. In 1940, after his release, Myasishchev headed a design bureau (in the same building), working on the long-range high-altitude bomber DVB-102 (ДВБ-102). In 1946–1951, Myasishchev was the head of the faculty and later dean of the Department of Aircraft Design at Moscow Aviation Institute. In 1956, he became chief aircraft designer. In 1960–1967, Myasishchev was appointed Head of the Central Aerohydrodynamic Institute (TsAGI). In 1967–1978, Myasishchev held a post of the chief aircraft designer of the Experimental Machine Building Plant, which would bear his name starting 1981.

Myasishchev designed different kinds of military aircraft, including Pe-2B, Pe-2I, Pe-2M, DIS, DB-108, M-4, 3M, M-50. He also worked on a cargo aircraft VM-T Atlant and high-altitude airplane M-17 Stratosphera. Among Myasishchev's aeroplane designs, the 3M and M-4 set nineteen world records, and the M-17 "Stratosphera" twenty.

Myasishchev was awarded Hero of Socialist Labour gold star (in 1957), three Orders of Lenin (in 1945, 1957, 1962), the Order of Suvorov II degree (in 1944), the Order of the October Revolution (in 1971), medals.

Myasishchev's mother was of Polish nationality, a daughter of Poles exiled to Siberia.

== Family ==
1927 — He married Elena Alexandrovna Spendiarova (1905-1981), the daughter of the Armenian composer Alexander Afanasyevich Spendiaryan.

1930 — They had a daughter Maria.

Granddaughter — Daria Myasishcheva (the common-law wife and mother of the children of Russian actor Pavel Derevyanko).

== Memory ==
- In 1980 Myasishchev Street appeared in the Moscow suburb of Zhukovsky.
- In Moscow a commemorative plaque was unveiled on the house where Myasishchev lived.
- In the 1990s a street in the new private sector of the city of Yefremov was named in his honor.
- In 2002 the Ministry of Digital Development, Communications and Mass Media of Russia issued a postal envelope dedicated to the 100th anniversary of Myasishchev's birth.
- On September 9, 2003 Myasishchev Street in the Filyovsky Park District of the Western Administrative District was named in his honor in Moscow.
- The experimental machine-building plant in Zhukovsky, founded under the leadership of Myasishchev, is named in his honor.
- A hall dedicated to V. M. Myasishchev has been opened in the Yefremov Museum of Local Lore.
- On September 28, 2017 on the day of the 115th anniversary of the great aircraft designer, a commemorative plaque dedicated to Vladimir Mikhailovich was unveiled at school No.1 in Yefremov.
- On September 28, 2018 on the day of the 116th anniversary of the great aircraft designer, a bust dedicated to Vladimir Mikhailovich was unveiled in V. M. Myasishchev Square in Yefremov.
- On October 16, 2019 by order of the General Director of JSC "GKNPC named after M. V. Khrunichev" A. G. Brewhenko, the branch of the Company — CB "Salyut" — was named after V. M. Myasishchev.
- On September 28, 2022 the Vladimir Myasishchev House Museum opened in Yefremov.
