= Boris Lisunov =

Soviet aerospace engineer (1898–1946)

- Борис Лисунов
- Born: 19 August 1898; Astrakhan Governorate, Russian Empire
- Died: 3 November 1946 (aged 48); Moscow, Soviet Union
- Education: Zhukovsky Air Force Engineering Academy
- Engineering career
- Discipline: Aeronautical Engineering
- Employer: Myasishchev design bureau
- Projects: Lisunov Li-2

Boris Pavlovich Lisunov (Russian: Борис Павлович Лисунов; 19 August 1898 – 3 November 1946) was a Soviet aerospace engineer.

== Biography ==
Lisunov was born in Durnovskaya (now Rassvet) stanitsa, Yenotaevsky uyezd of the Governorate of Astrakhan, Russian Empire. His father was a Cossack officer.

In 1918 he graduated from the Saratov secondary school #2 and went to Moscow to study at the Zhukovsky Air Force Engineering Academy, where he made friends with another prominent Russian aircraft designer, Sergey Ilyushin. From 1926, he served as an engineer-mechanic to an aviation squadron in the Soviet Air Force, rising to the position of chief engineer at Aircraft Factory No. 39 in Kharkov.

In November 1936, Lisunov travelled to the Douglas Aircraft works in Santa Monica, California, to start the process of licensed production of the Douglas DC-3 in the Soviet Union. From November 1936 to April 1939, Lisunov documented every part of the DC-3 and its production tooling. He also documented post-delivery in-service support. Together with his boss, Vladimir Myasishchev, Lisunov started the process of re-engineering the DC-3 with the objective of putting the model into production. Most of the work involved conversion of the drawings and documents into the metric system.

On 27 January 1938, Lisunov was appointed technical director of the Aviation Plant No. 84 near Moscow, in Khimki. After Myasishchev was arrested, Lisunov was appointed to head the further development of the DC-3 derivative named Lisunov Li-2. Military and civil versions of Li-2 were produced by a few Soviet aircraft plants from 1939 to 1952, making it the most common Soviet airliner in the 1940s.

In September 1941 as the Nazis were approaching Moscow, Lisunov managed to swiftly evacuate the aircraft plant to the safe location that was chosen to be Tashkent, capital of the Uzbek SSR. Soon the newly-established aircraft plant, later known as Tashkent Aviation Production Association, started to contribute to the Soviet war effort with the domestically-made Li-2s.

Lisunov died in 1946 after having suffered a heart attack. Shortly before his death, he was appointed a managerial position with the Ministry of Aviation Industry and awarded the Order of Lenin and the Order of the Red Star for successful completion of the Li-2 project.

The Astrakhan State Archive and the Rassvet secondary school preserve Lisunov's memory.

== See also ==
- Lisunov Li-2
- Douglas DC-3
- Tashkent Aviation Production Association
