= Bomber gap =

Cold War intimidation tactic used by the Soviet Union's military

The bomber gap was the false Cold War belief that the Soviet Union's Long Range Aviation department had gained an advantage in deploying jet-powered strategic bombers. Widely accepted for several years by US officials, the gap was used as a political talking point in the United States to justify a great increase in defense spending.

Two main causes of the gap were the 1955 Soviet Aviation Day, which created the appearance of a larger bomber fleet than actually existed, and a 1956 U-2 surveillance mission which counted the number of bombers at a single Soviet airbase and extrapolated from that to an estimate of an entire bomber fleet, when in fact the entire bomber fleet was at the airbase in question. In response to these estimates, the US Air Force undertook a massive buildup of its bomber fleet, which peaked at over 2500 bombers to counter the perceived Soviet threat.

By 1960, subsequent U-2 surveillance flights had proven that the bomber gap did not exist.

== Appearance ==
On February 15, 1954, Aviation Week published an article describing new Soviet jet bombers capable of carrying a nuclear bomb from their bases to the US. The aircraft was the Myasishchev M-4 Bison. Over the next year and a half, the rumors were debated publicly in the press and soon in Congress.

Adding to the concerns was an infamous event in July 1955. At the Soviet Aviation Day demonstrations at the Tushino Airfield, ten Bison bombers were flown past the reviewing stand, flew out of sight, quickly turned around, and then flew past the stands again with eight more. That presented the illusion that there were 28 aircraft in the flyby. Western analysts, extrapolating from the illusionary 28 aircraft, judged that by 1960, the Soviets would have 800.

== US Air Force raises numbers of bombers ==
At the time, the Air Force had just introduced its own strategic jet bomber, the B-52 Stratofortress, and the shorter-range B-47 Stratojet was still suffering from a variety of technical problems that limited its availability. Its staff started pressing for accelerated production of the B-52 but also grudgingly accepted calls for expanded air defense.

The Air Force was generally critical of spending effort on defense after it had studied the results of the World War II bombing campaigns and concluded that former British Prime Minister Stanley Baldwin's pre-war thinking on the fruitlessness of air defense was mostly correct: "The bomber will always get through." Like the British, the US Air Force concluded that money would better be spent on making the offensive arm larger to deter an attack. The result was a production series consisting of thousands of aircraft. Over 2,000 B-47s and almost 750 B-52s were built to match the imagined fleet of Soviet aircraft.

== Disproval of gap ==
US President Dwight D. Eisenhower had always been skeptical of the gap. However, with no evidence to disprove it, he agreed to the development of the U-2 to find out for sure.

The first U-2 flights started in 1956. One early mission, Mission 2020, flown by Martin Knutson on 9 July 1956, flew over an airfield southwest of Leningrad (Note: Endless confusion has been caused by Knutson identifying this base as "Engels", which is the name of a major bomber base outside Saratov in southern Russia. Given the flight path illustrated in Whittell, he was almost certainly actually flying over either Levashovo or Gorelovo, which would have acted as "acceptance bases" for aircraft fresh from the factory in Moscow.) and photographed 30 M-4 Bison bombers on the ramp. Multiplying by the number of Soviet bomber bases, the intelligence suggested the Soviets were already well on their way to deploying large numbers, with National Intelligence Estimate 11-4-57 of November 1957 claiming 150 to 250 by 1958, and over 600 by the mid-1960s.

In fact, the U-2 had actually photographed the entire Bison fleet; there were no M-4s at any of the other bases. Follow-up missions over the next year showed increasing evidence that the Soviet military was actually at a very low level of activity. Further, the CIA received information from the factories that showed that production rate had slowed down. A follow-up report in April 1958 by Sherman Kent of the CIA stated that the program appeared to be winding down, not speeding up, and that the estimates for the force should be decreased.

The Air Force, however, remained skeptical. In May 1958, they instead suggested that production was being carried out at Kuybyshev, Kazan, and Irkutsk, and the aircraft being delivered to Engels-2, Bila Tserkva, and Orsha Southwest - all locations that had not yet been overflown. They suggested these be photographed, with the expectation that it would also provide information on new equipment.

By this time, after receiving a stern diplomatic note from the Soviets, Eisenhower had shut down the U-2 flights. To preserve some sense of plausible deniability, in 1957 the CIA had reached an agreement with MI6 and began training Royal Air Force pilots on the U-2. The group moved to Turkey in 1959 and began preparing for the missions. The very first flight, on 6 December 1959 with pilot Wing Commander Robert ‘Robbie’ Robinson, photographed the Kapustin Yar missile test range, the Engels-2 air base, and the Kuybyshev bomber factory. They showed no sign of the bombers nor the production capacity for them, and demonstrated that the total number of Soviet bombers was far less than the inflated estimates of the CIA and Air Force. Allen Dulles, head of the CIA, called it "a million-dollar photo". At least in official circles, the gap had been disproved.

As it was later discovered, the M-4 was unable to meet its original range goals and was limited to about 8,000 kilometers (5,000 mi). Unlike the US, the Soviets still lacked overseas bases in the Western Hemisphere and so the M-4 could not attack the US and then land at a friendly airbase. Production ended in favor of an improved version, the 3M, but it too was unable to carry out attacks on much of the US, including Washington, DC. Interest in the M-4 waned, and only 93 were produced before the assembly lines were shut down in 1963. The vast majority were used as tankers or maritime reconnaissance aircraft; only the original ten shown at the air show and nine newer 3MD13 models served on nuclear alert.

== In popular culture ==
- In Stanley Kubrick's movie Dr. Strangelove, the notion of a "Bomber Gap" is parodied when the character of Buck Turgidson (a Pentagon general) declares that the US "must not allow a mineshaft gap" in discussing the use of mineshafts as nuclear fallout shelters.
- In That '70s Show Season 3, Episode 11, main characters Eric and Donna argue about the existence of the gap while writing a report for school.

== See also ==
- Missile gap
- Cruiser gap
- Nuclear arms race
