= Dexter Air Taxi =

Russian airline

IATA	ICAO	Call sign
-	DXT	Dexter
- Founded: 2004
- Hubs: Moscow–Zhukovsky
- Secondary hubs: Novy Urengoy
- Fleet size: 58
- Headquarters: Moscow, Russia
- Website: dexter.aero/

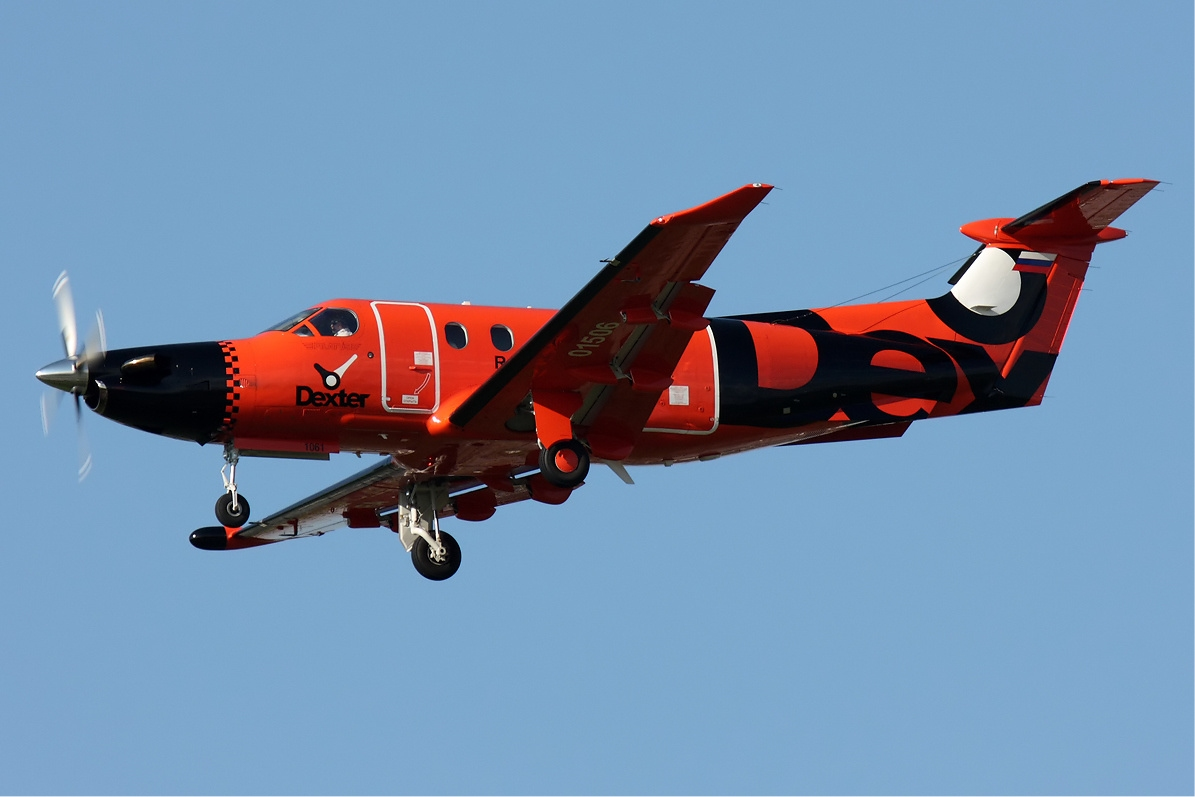
Pilatus PC-12

Dexter Air Taxi is a Russian air taxi service operating distances of up to 2000 kilometres, it aims to have its services cover the whole of Russia. Sabre Holdings is assisting the operation with ambitions of more than 250 4-6 seater aircraft deployed and over 1500 departures a day. It is currently on the List of airlines banned in the European Union.

== Destinations ==
As of September 2017, Dexter Air Taxi did not serve any domestic destinations:.

== Fleet ==
Aircraft type	Active	Notes
Pilatus PC-12	10	
Myasishchev M-101T	3	
