= Myasishchev M-18 =

Type of aircraft

M-18

General information
- Type: Bomber
- National origin: Soviet Union
- Manufacturer: Myasishchev

The Myasishchev M-18 was a design for a Soviet supersonic bomber with a variable-sweep wing. The aircraft was developed in response to a Soviet 1972 program for a new multi-misson, supersonic, variable geometry wing strategic bomber, with a maximum speed of Mach 2.3, as a response to the U.S. Rockwell B-1 Lancer program. The project was dropped in favour of the Tupolev Tu-160 program. Although the design was the most successful compared to the Tu-160 and Sukhoi T-4, it was dropped as Tupolev had the most potential to go ahead with the supersonic bomber project.

In 1973, Tupolev was assigned the development of a new aircraft based on the Myasishchev design.
