= Lisunov Li-2 =

Airliner and military transport aircraft

Li-2
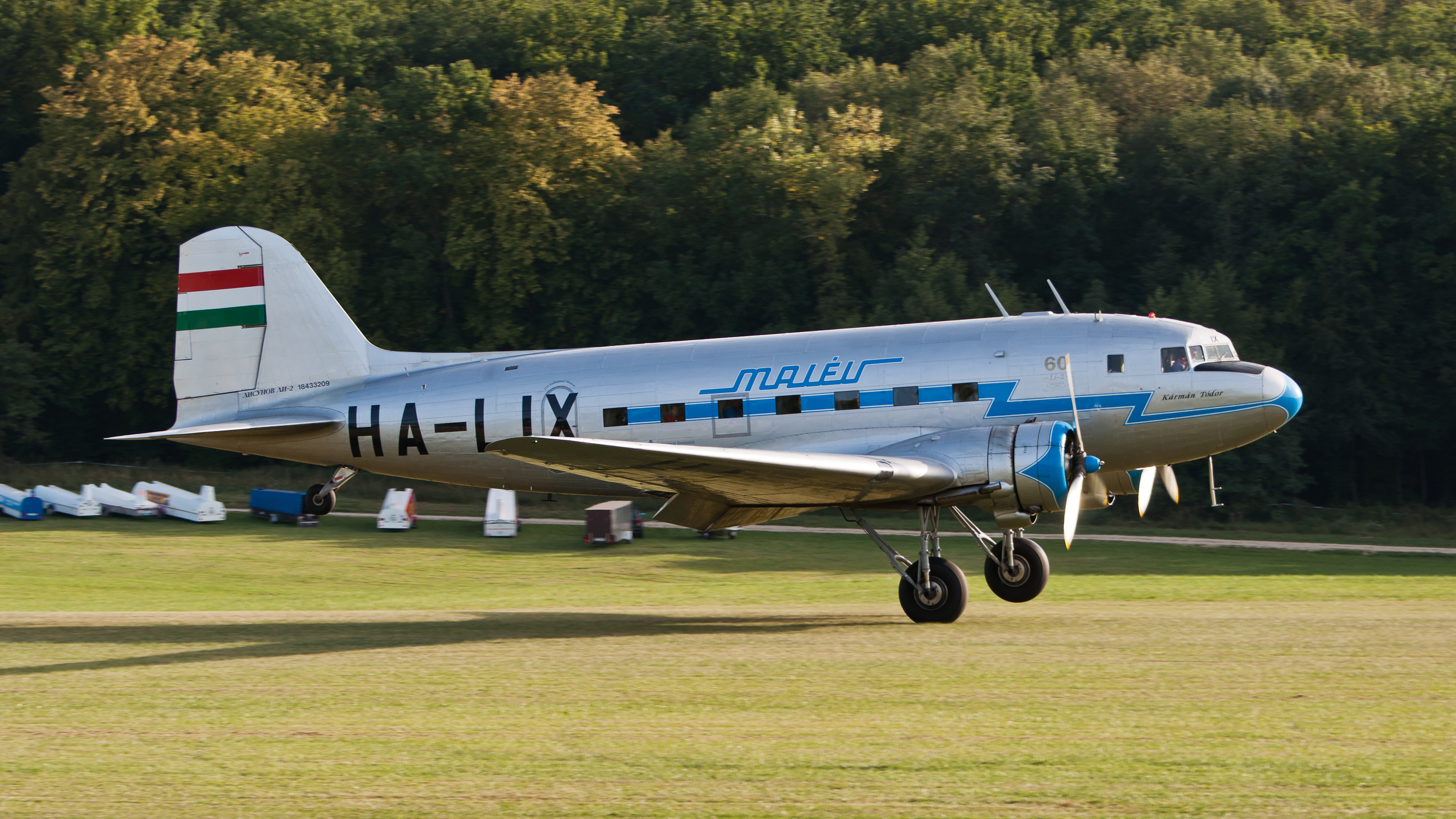
- Li-2 HA-LIX landing at Hahnweide airfield, Germany in 2011, in original MALÉV livery

General information
- Type: Cargo/passenger utility aircraft and light bomber
- National origin: Soviet Union
- Manufacturer: State Aircraft Plant No. 84
- Status: Out of production; in limited service
- Primary users: Soviet Air Force Aeroflot
- Number built: 6,157 (per later research 4,937)

History
- Manufactured: 1939–1952
- Introduction date: 1939
- Developed from: Douglas DC-3

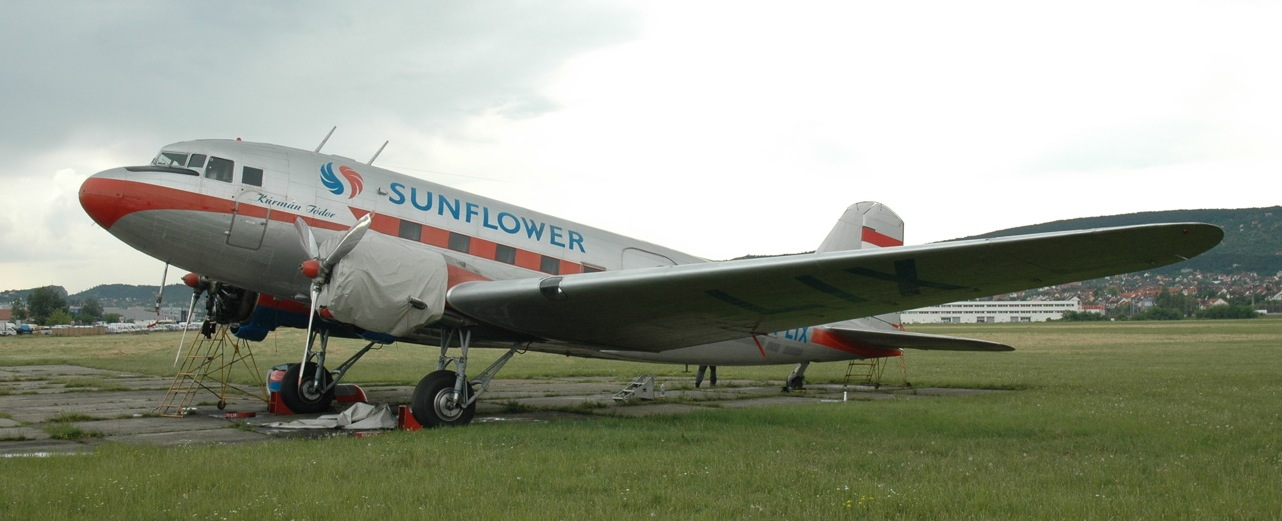
Li-2 HA-LIX in Budaörs, Hungary, 2008. It was then the only airworthy Li-2 known. 2002-2008 named Kármán Tódor

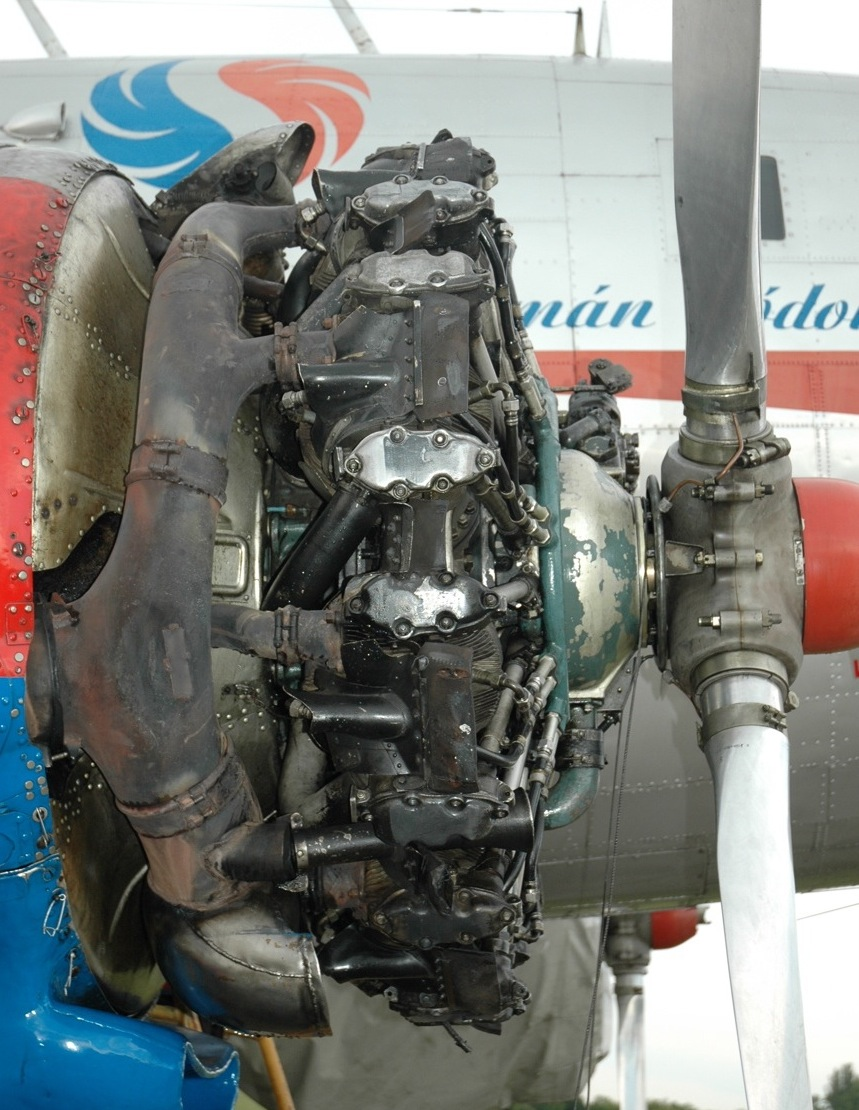
Shvetsov ASh-62 radial piston engine, mounted on Li-2 HA-LIX, 2008

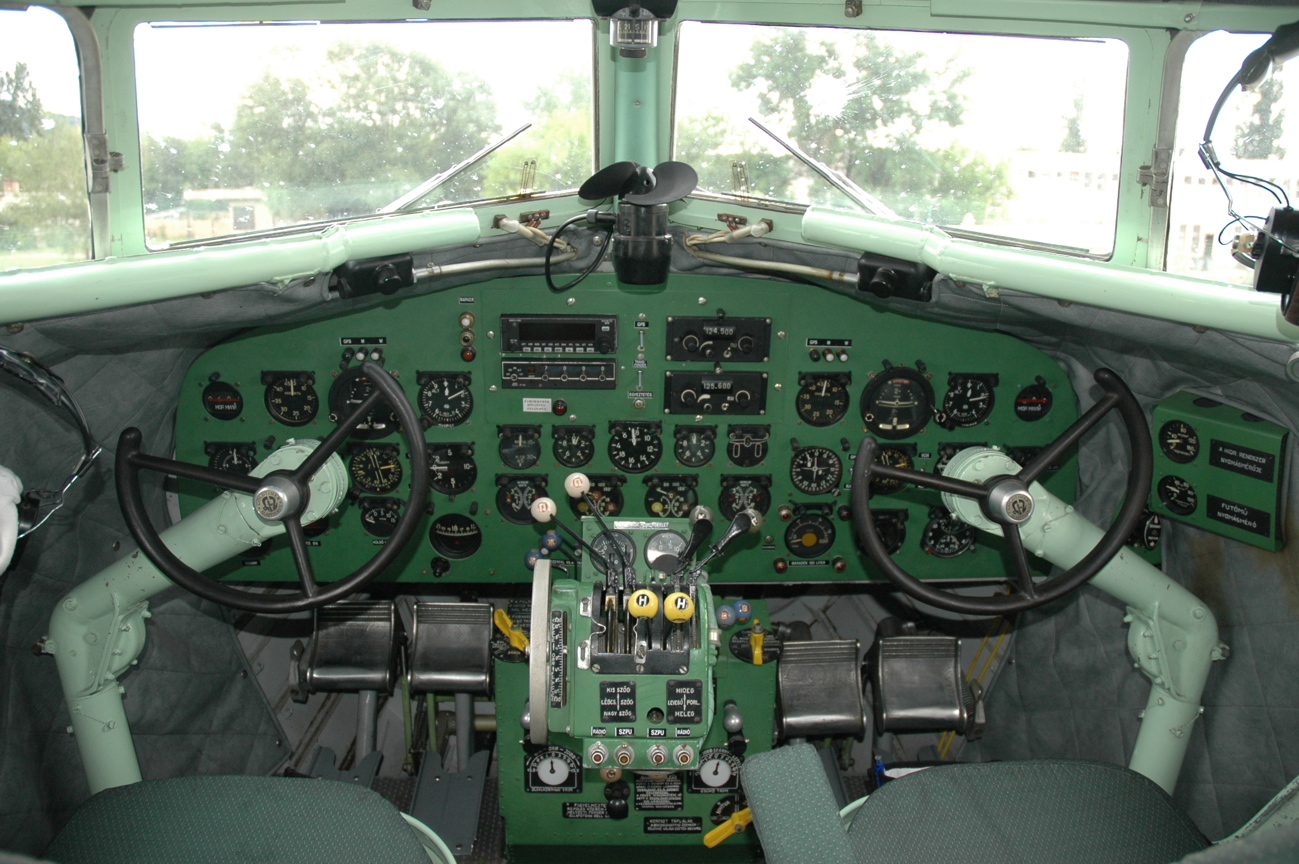
Li-2 HA-LIX Cockpit, 2008

The Lisunov Li-2 (NATO reporting name: Cab), originally designated PS-84, is a license-built Soviet version of the Douglas DC-3. It was produced by State Aircraft Plant No. 84 in Moscow-Khimki and, after the factory's evacuation in 1941, at the Tashkent Aviation Production Association in Tashkent. The project was directed by aeronautical engineer Boris Pavlovich Lisunov.

== Design and development ==
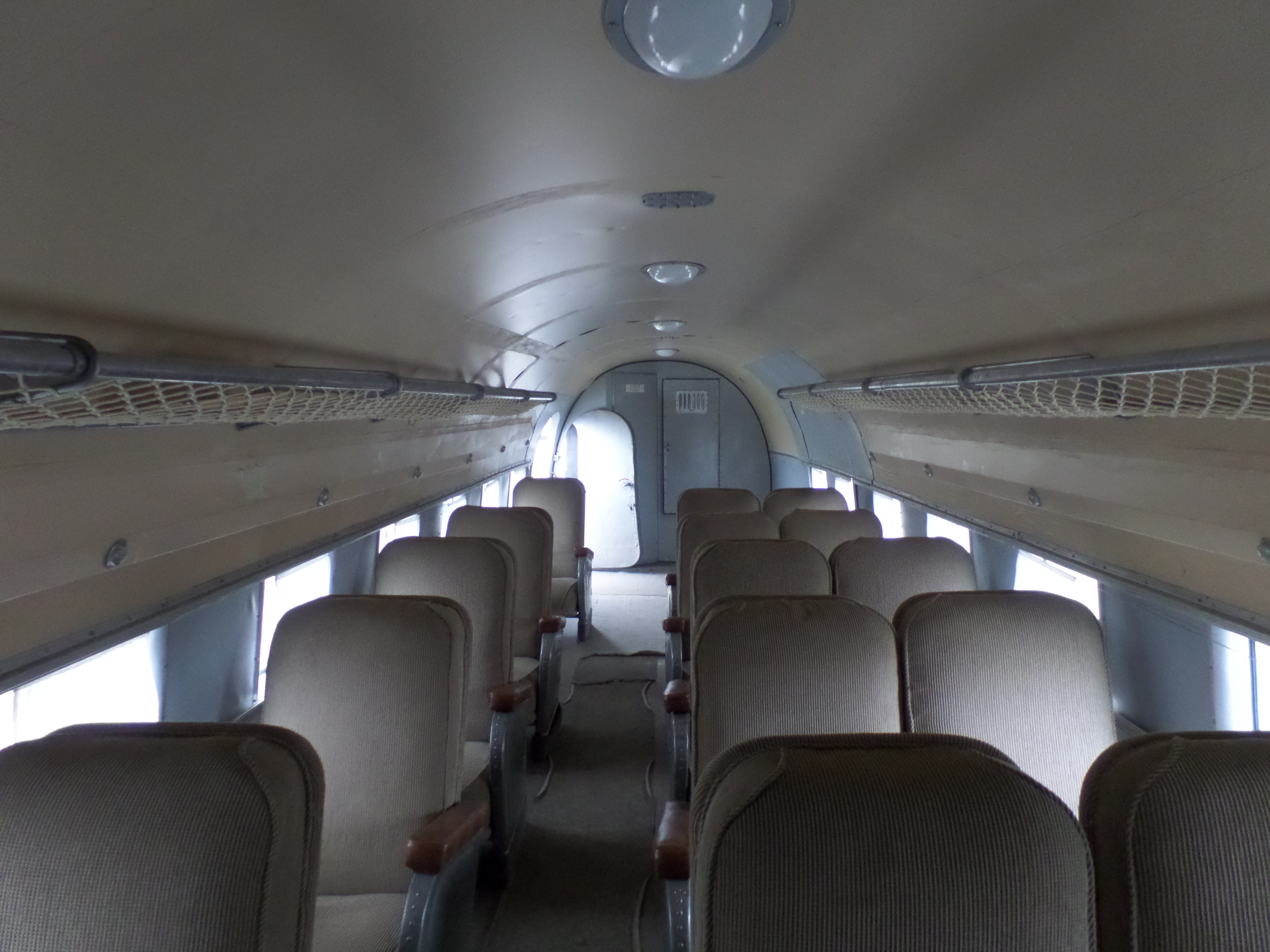
Li-2 passenger cabin

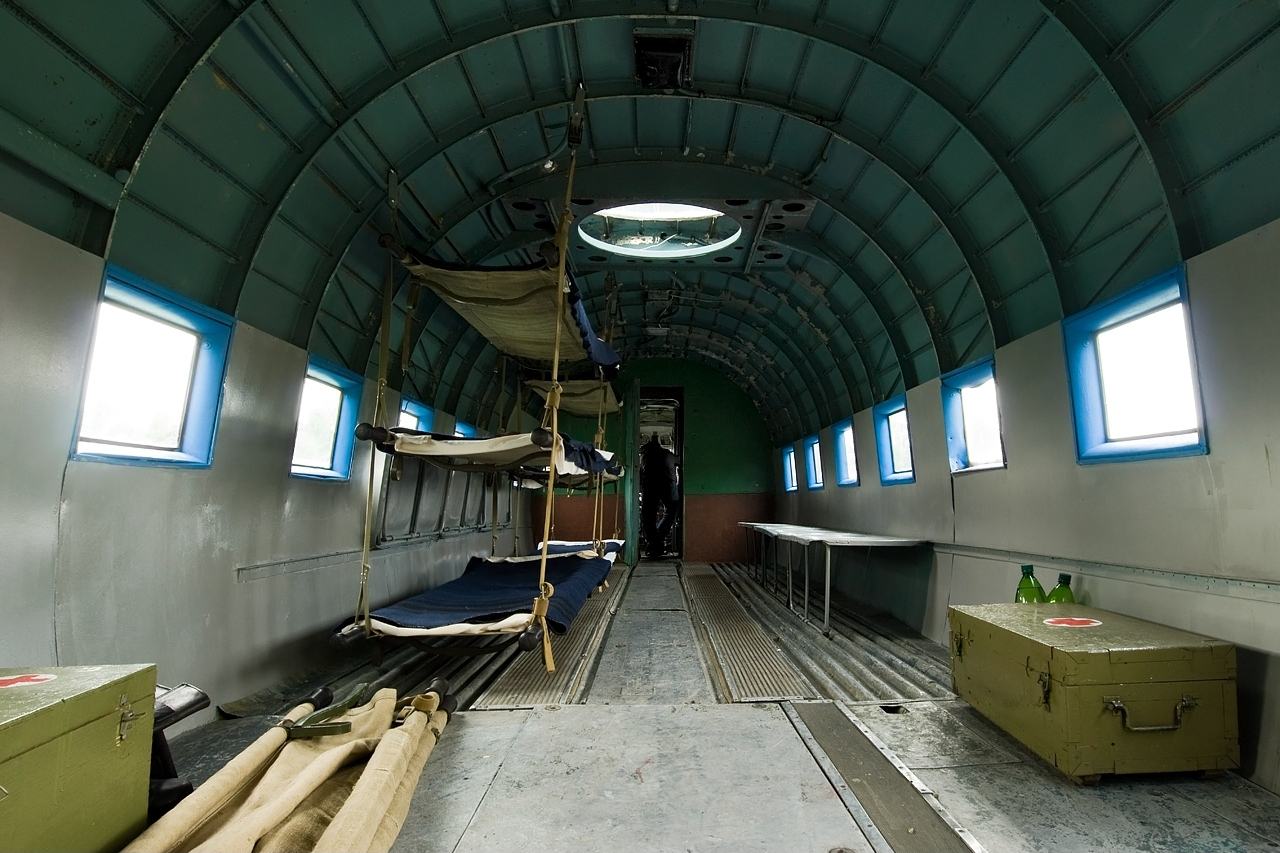
Li-2 medevac cabin

The Soviet Union received its first DC-2 in 1935. A total of 18 DC-3s had been ordered on 11 April 1936, and the government of the USSR purchased 21 DC-3s for operation by Aeroflot before World War II. A production licence was awarded to the government of the USSR on 15 July 1936. Lisunov spent two years at the Douglas Aircraft Company, between November 1936 and April 1939 translating the design. One of the engineers who accompanied him to Douglas was Vladimir Mikhailovich Myasishchev. Design work and production were undertaken at State Aviation Factory 84 in Khimki (now a suburb of Moscow). The Soviet version was given the designation PS-84 – Passazhirskiy Samolyot 84, passenger airplane 84 (i.e. made in GAZ / State Aircraft Plant No. 84).

Despite the original intention to incorporate as few changes as necessary to the basic design, the plant had to make some 1,293 engineering change orders to the original Douglas drawings, involving part design, dimensions, materials and processes, most as a part of metrication of the design from U.S. customary units to suit Soviet standards, no small task for Vladimir Myasishchev to accomplish. The well-established Shvetsov OKB-19 design bureau, responsible for the great bulk of the Soviets' air-cooled radial aviation powerplant designs of the 1930-40s, used their Shvetsov ASh-62IR radial engines, a Soviet development of the nine-cylinder Wright R-1820 Cyclone 9, to power the PS-84. The same Wright Aeronautical Cyclone 9 radial also powered the earliest Douglas DST "Sleeper Transport" versions, and initial 21-passenger versions, of the original American DC-3 airliner.

The Soviet standard design practice usually mandated fully shuttered engines in order to cope with temperature extremes. A slightly shorter span was incorporated, but many of the other alterations were less evident. The passenger door was moved to the right or starboard side of the fuselage, with a top-opening cargo door on the left or port side in place of the original passenger door. The structural reinforcement included slightly heavier skins, because the metric skin gauges were not exact equivalents of the American alloy sheet metal. Standard Soviet metric hardware was different and the various steel substructures such as engine mounts and landing gear, wheels, and tires were also quite different from the original design. Later modifications allowed the provision of ski landing gear in order to operate in remote and Arctic regions. The first PS-84s had begun to emerge from the GAZ-84 production line by 1939.

By the time Germany invaded the USSR on 22 June 1941, 237 PS-84s had been built at GAZ-84, all in civil passenger configuration. In response to the invasion, the Kremlin set in motion a plan to relocate much of the industrial capability of the Soviet Union to the East, with production of the Li-2 ending up at GAZ-33 in Tashkent, now the capital of Uzbekistan. After a monumental struggle, the factory was producing PS-84s again by January 1942.

GAZ-124 at Kazan also built ten aircraft before the start of World War II, and 353 Li-2Ts were built by GAZ-126 at Komsomolsk-on-Amur between 1946 and 1950, before that plant switched to MiG-15 production.

Some military versions of the Li-2 also had bombing equipment—such as bomb sight and bomb racks, and defensive turret, unlike the military C-47 development of the DC-3, which was strictly an unarmed military transport. The defensive armaments consisted of MV-3 dorsal turret with a 7.62 mm (.30 in) ShKAS machine gun, later replaced with a 12.7 mm (.50 in) UBT heavy machine gun. Additionally two ShKAS machine guns on pivot mount could also be mounted on both sides of the rear fuselage near the cargo door. A version designated Li-2VV (Voyenny Variant = military variant) had a redesigned nose for extra ShKAS machine gun and could carry up to four 250 kg (551 lb) bombs under the central fuselage. Smaller bombs could be carried inside the fuselage and thrown out of the cargo door by the crew.

== Operational history ==
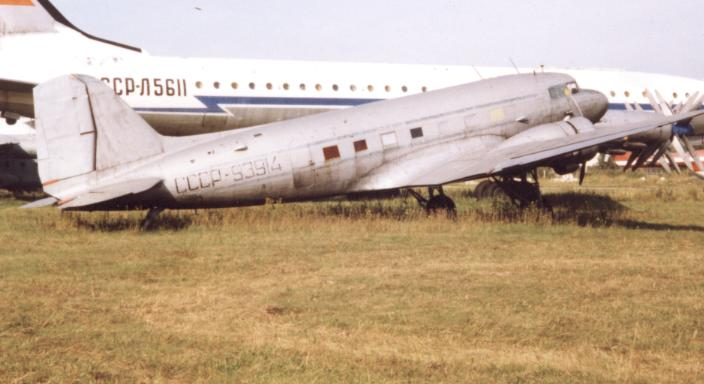
Lisunov Li-2 of Aeroflot at Monino near Moscow in 1994

The PS-84 had flown with Aeroflot primarily as a passenger transport before World War II. When Germany attacked the Soviet Union in 1941 many of the PS-84s were taken into military use and redesignated the Lisunov Li-2 in 1942. The military models were equipped with a machine gun on dorsal turret. The aircraft were used for transport, partisan supply, bombing, and as ambulance aircraft.

A total of 4,937 aircraft were produced of all Li-2 variants between 1940 and 1954 and it saw extensive use in Eastern Europe until the 1960s. The last survivors in use were noted in China and Vietnam during the 1980s. There were many versions, including airliner, cargo, military transport, reconnaissance, aerial photography, parachute drop, bomber and high altitude variants. In Poland they were fitted for cropdusting against forest pests. The Li-2 also saw extensive service in the Chinese Air Force in the 1940s and 1950s.

Several airlines operated Lisunov Li-2s, among others Aeroflot, CAAK, CSA, LOT, MALÉV, Polar Aviation, TABSO and Tarom.

Only one Li-2 restored to airworthy condition exists in Europe. The Hungarian registered HA-LIX was built in 1949 in Airframe Factory Nr.84 (GAZ-84) of Tashkent, as serial number 18433209 and was operated by MALÉV till 1964. It was withdrawn to a museum in 1974 as an airforce parachute trainer airplane. After a complete reconstruction finished in 2001 it flies sightseeing tours and regularly participates at air shows. It is operated by the Goldtimer Foundation, based at Budaörs Airport, Budapest, Hungary. The North Korean Air Force is known to still use a number of Li-2s for transport, although they may have been decommissioned despite their continued presence on certain airbases.

== Variants ==
Lisunov Li-2 side elevation silhouette

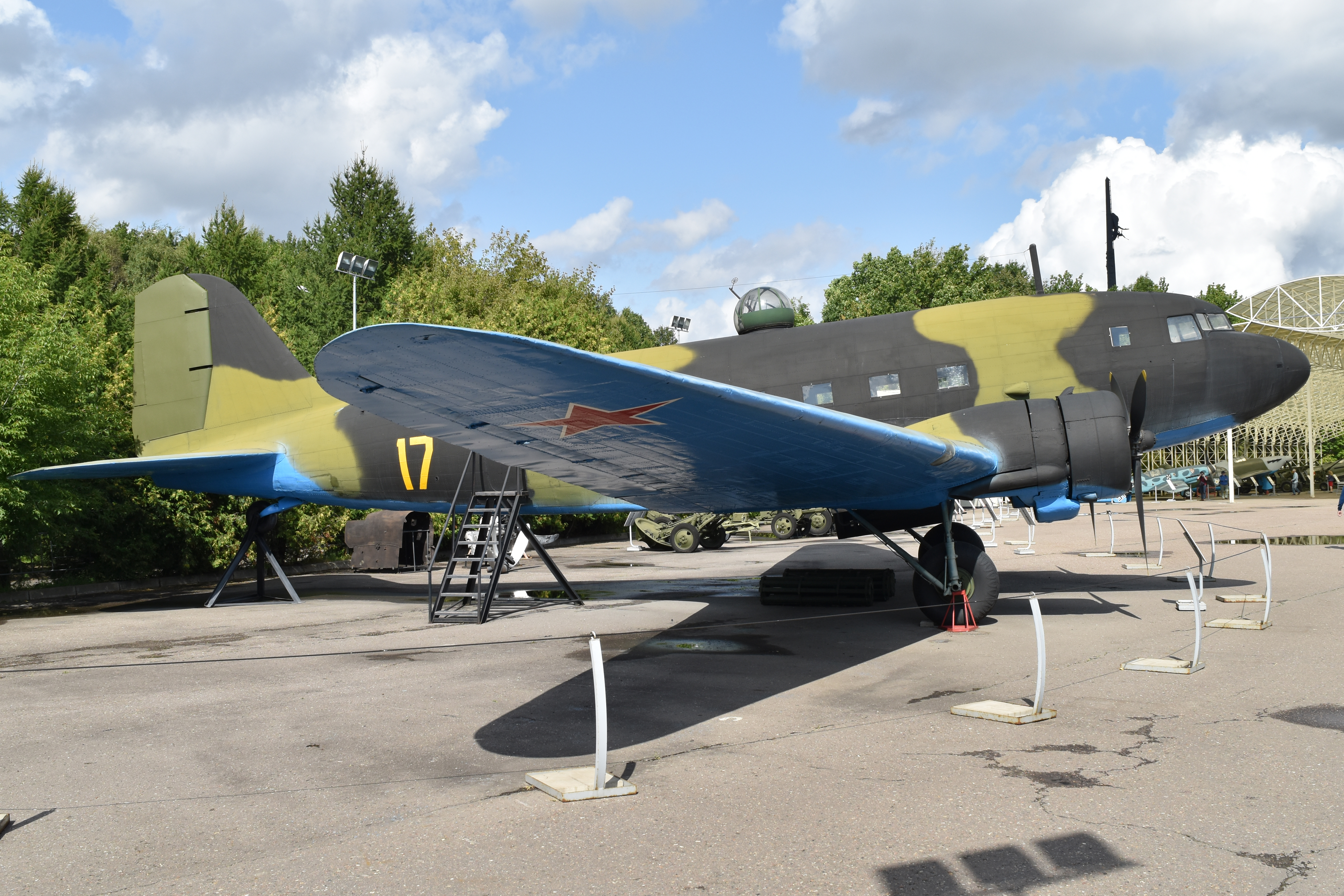
Lisunov Li-2 bomber at the Museum of the Great Patriotic War, Moscow

PS-84
Original passenger airliner, equipped with 14-28 seats. Somewhat smaller span and higher empty weight, it was also equipped with lower-powered engines compared to the DC-3. The cargo door was also transposed to the right side of the fuselage.
PS-84I
Medevac version.
Li-2
Redesignation of PS-84s impressed into military use.
Li-2D
Paratroop transport version (1942), with reinforced floor and tie-downs, plus cargo doors (slightly smaller than the C-47 doors) on the left.
Li-2F
Aerial photography version.
Li-2G
Freighter version.
Li-2K
Military transport aircraft with defensive armament (designation started from 17 September 1942).
Li-2P
Basic civil passenger model (1945).
Li-2PG
Civil "combi" passenger-cargo version.
Li-2PR
Glass nose version.
Li-2R
"Reconnaissance" version, with bulged windows fitted behind the cockpit.
Li-2T
Transport version (1945).
LI-2T
Polish bomber trainer version.
Li-2V
High-altitude weather surveillance version of the Li-2, equipped with turbocharged engines.
Li-2VV
Transport/bomber version (1942)
Li-2NB
Night bomber version (1944), minimal changes from ordinary bomber version. The navigator/bombardier station was moved to behind the left pilot, night bombsight was installed behind the emergency door to improve aiming, and the emergency door itself replaced with convex glass.
Li-3
Yugoslavian version equipped with American Pratt & Whitney R-1830 engines (similar to the DC-3)
Kamov Ka-Li-2 Vintokryl "Project-Kh"
Proposed compound helicopter with a Kuznetsov TV-2 turboshaft driving two three-blade rotors; not built.

== Operators ==
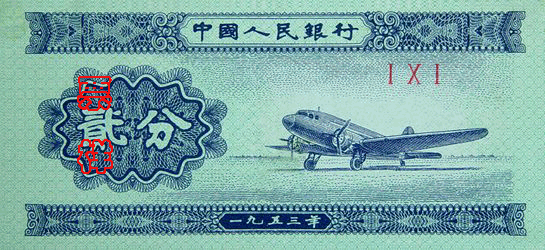
Li-2 on the Chinese RMB banknote

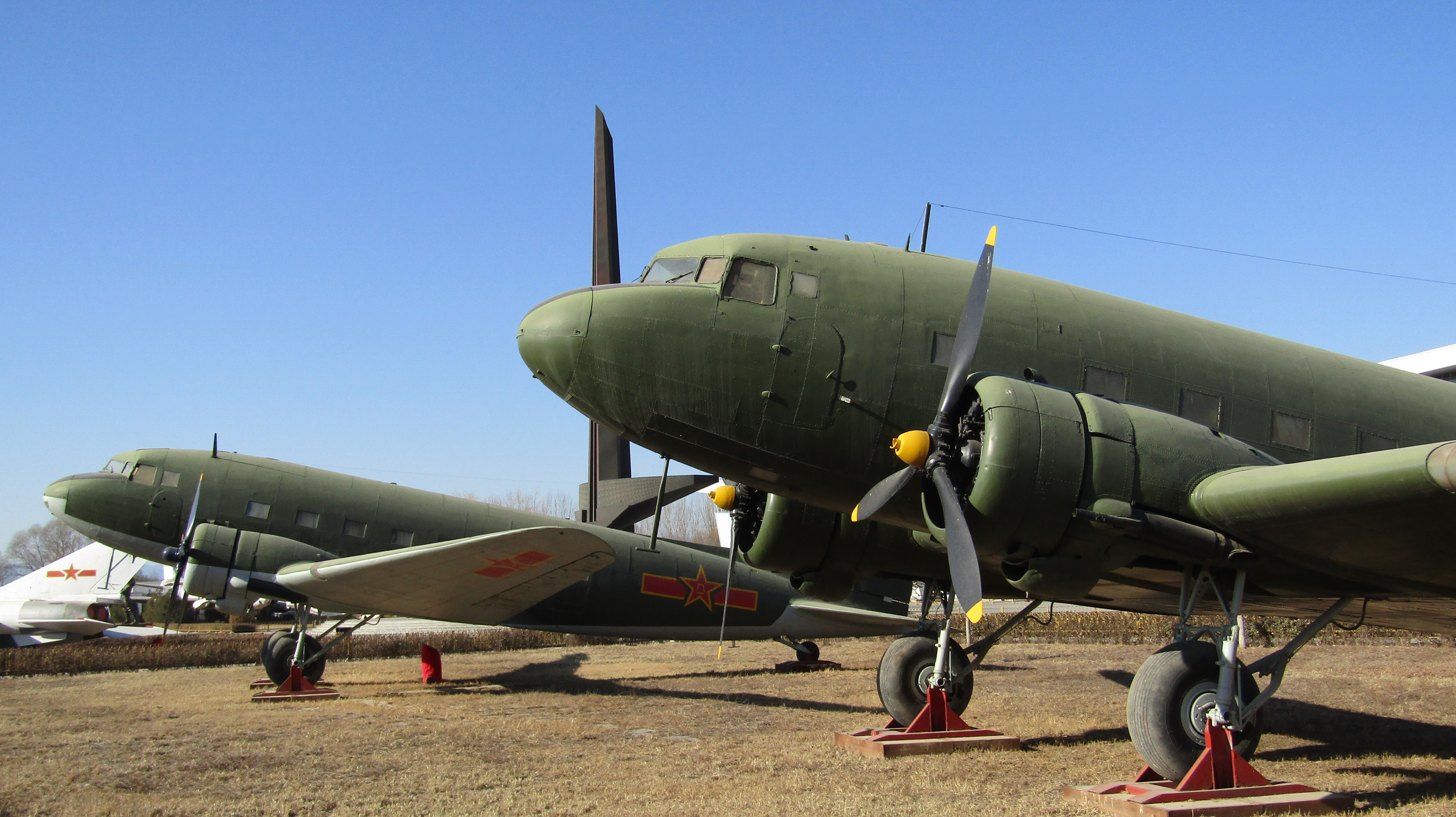
Lisunov Li-2 at Chinese Aviation Museum

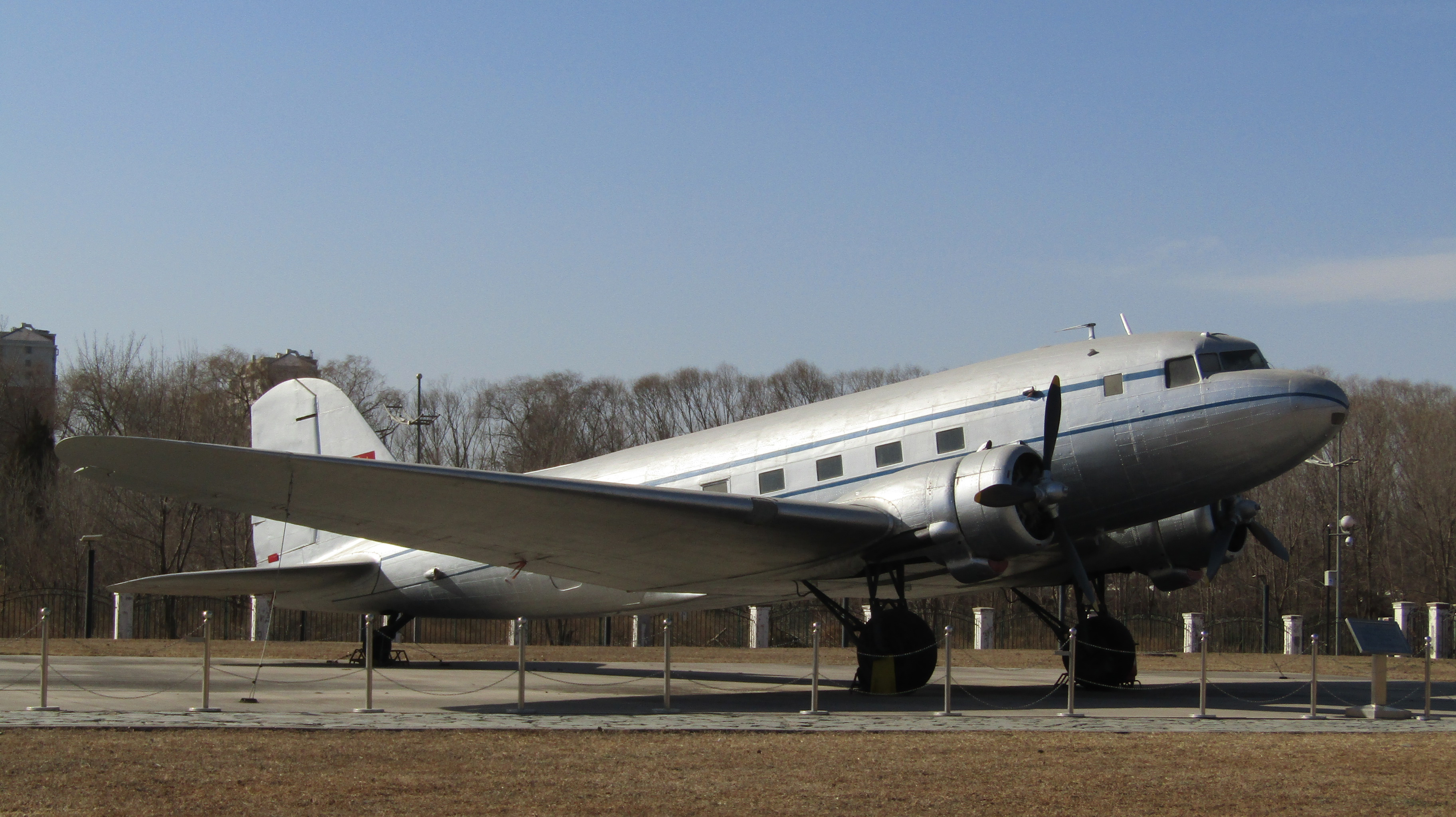
Lisunov Li-2 at Beijing Civil Aviation Museum

=== Military ===
Albania
Albanian Air Force

Bulgaria
Bulgarian Air Force
Czechoslovakia
Czechoslovak Air Force
China
People's Liberation Army Air Force
Total of 214 Li-2 aircraft were imported for military and civil usage; the last Li-2 retired in 1986.
Forest Protection Police (predecessor of People's Armed Police Forestry Corps) - used by Forest Police Smokejumper Company

Hungary
Hungarian Air Force: Maszovlet: Malév
Laos

- Royal Lao Air Force
- Pathet Lao guerrilla forces (1962–1975)

Madagascar
Mongolia
Mongolian People's Army Aviation
North Korea
Korean People's Air Force
(North Vietnam) Democratic Republic of Vietnam
Vietnam People's Air Force
Poland
Air Force of the Polish Army (after 1947 Polish Air Force)
Romania
Romanian Air Force
Soviet Union
Soviet Air Force

- 12th Aviation Division Long-Range, from 1943
- As of January 1955, a transport aviation division of Long Range Aviation
- other units

Syria
Syrian Air Force
Yugoslavia
SFR Yugoslav Air Force

- 1st Transport Aviation Regiment (1945–1948)
- 119th Transport Aviation Regiment (1948–1959, Li-3 1970)

=== Civil ===
China

- SKOGA
- CAAC

Czechoslovakia

- CSA
- Government of Czechoslovakia

Hungary

- Maszovlet
- Malév Hungarian Airlines

North Korea
Korean Airways
Poland
LOT Polish Airlines operated up to 40 Li-2s as passenger airliners until 1960s.
Romania
TAROM
Soviet Union
Aeroflot
Vietnam
CAAV

== Specifications (Li-2P) ==
Lisunov Li–2

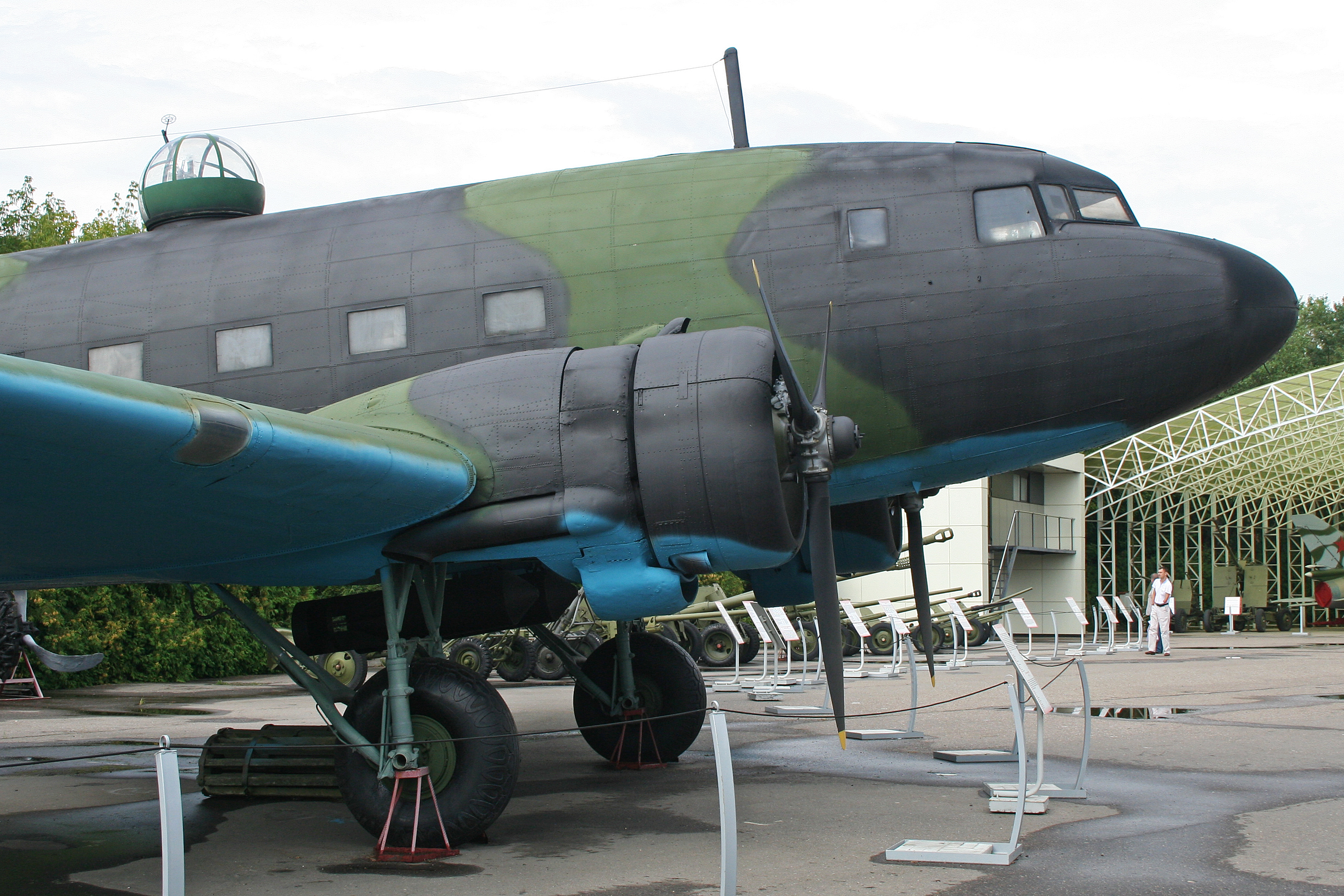
Bombs and defensive turret of Li-2

Data from Aircraft of the Soviet Union : the encyclopaedia of Soviet aircraft since 1917

General characteristics

- Crew: 4 (5-6 Li-2T)
- Capacity: 24 passengers / (20 troops Li-2T)
- Length: 19.65 m (64 ft 6 in)
- Wingspan: 28.81 m (94 ft 6 in)
- Wing area: 91.33 m^{2} (983.1 sq ft)
- Airfoil: root: NACA 2215; tip: NACA 2206
- Empty weight: 7,700 kg (16,976 lb)
- Max takeoff weight: 11,280 kg (24,868 lb)
- Powerplant: 2 × Shvetsov M-62 9-cylinder air-cooled radial piston engines, 670 kW (900 hp) each
- Propellers: 3-bladed variable-pitch propellers

Performance

- Maximum speed: 280 km/h (170 mph, 150 kn)
- Cruise speed: 245 km/h (152 mph, 132 kn)
- Range: 2,500 km (1,600 mi, 1,300 nmi)
- Service ceiling: 5,600 m (18,400 ft)

Armament

- Guns: :* 3× 7.62 mm (.30 in) ShKAS machine guns Li-2T / Li-2VV

- 1× 12.7 mm (.50 in) Berezin UBK machine gun Li-2T / Li-2VV

- Bombs: :* 1,000 kg bombs (normal load) Li-2VV

- 2,600 kg (5,732 lb) of bombs (short distances) Li-2VV

== See also ==
Related development

- Douglas DC-3
- Douglas C-47 Skytrain
- Douglas AC-47 Spooky
- Showa/Nakajima L2D

Aircraft of comparable role, configuration, and era

- Boeing 247
- Ilyushin Il-14
- Junkers Ju 52
- Saab 90 Scandia

Related lists

- List of aircraft of World War II
- List of civil aircraft
