= Cosmopolis XXI =

Russian concept launch vehicle

Cosmopolis XXI was a late 2000s Russian concept launch vehicle billed as a space tourism vehicle, similar to Mojave Aerospace's Tier One program. Designed and built by the Myasishchev Design Bureau, it would use the M-55X launch aircraft (derived from Myasishchev M-55), and the proposed C-21 spaceplane or its successor the Explorer. It would be a TSTSO (Two-Stage to SubOrbit) launch platform.

The Explorer spaceplane is a suborbital tourist spaceplane based on the C-21 design. The plane was being developed by Space Adventures with the Russian Federal Space Agency and was intended to carry 3 passengers. It is to be air-launched by carrier aircraft from a Space Adventures spaceport. Space Adventures abandoned the Explorer project in 2010 because "it got too expensive." It is unclear if Russia continues its development.
