= Kolesov RD-36 =

Supersonic turbojet engine

RD-36-51
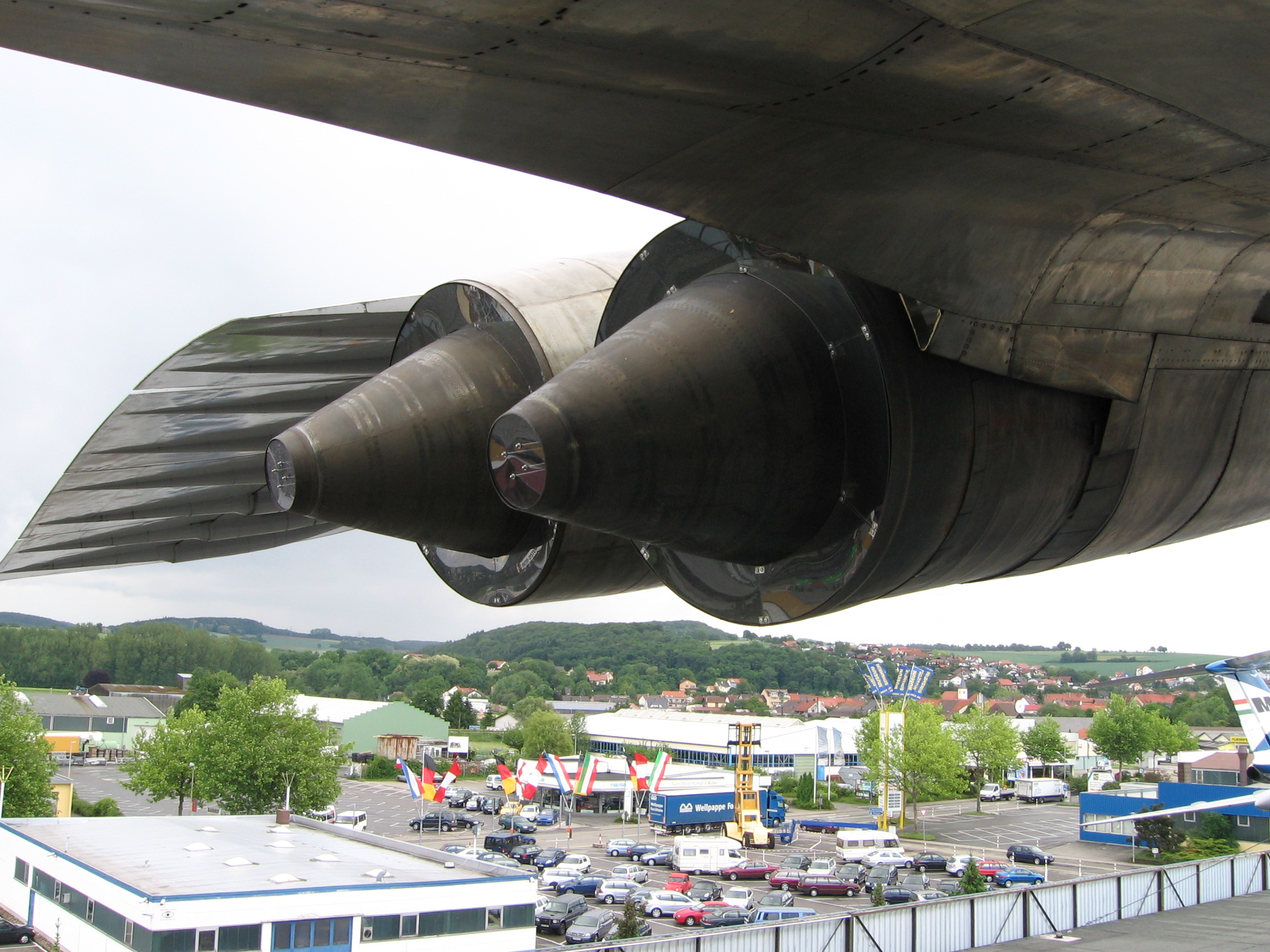
- View of variable area plug nozzles as fitted for engines in the TU-144D
- Type: Turbojet
- National origin: Soviet Union
- Manufacturer: Kolesov Design Bureau
- Major applications: Tupolev Tu-144

The Kolesov RD-36 was a supersonic turbojet engine used on various Soviet aircraft projects.

== Design and development ==
Developed at OKB-36 (P. A. Kolesov) and produced at the Rybinsk Motor-Building Plant, the RD-36-51A engine was developed for the Tu-144D supersonic passenger aircraft. A simplified version with a fixed nozzle for the high-altitude Myasishchev M-17 was designated RD-36-51B. The engine developed a thrust of 7,000 kgf (15,000 lbf; 69,000 N). The RD36-51A engine passed all state bench and flight tests in 1973–75 (with flight testing on the Tu-144D).

The engine's specifications were:

- Maximum thrust at take-off = 20,000 kgf (44,000 lbf; 200,000 N)
- Maximum thrust during supersonic cruise = 5,000 kgf (11,000 lbf; 49,000 N) altitude = 18,000 m (59,000 ft), speed = 2,350 km/h (1,460 mph)
- Maximum thrust during subsonic cruise= 3,000 kgf (6,600 lbf; 29,000 N) altitude = 11,000 m (36,000 ft), speed = 1,000 km/h (620 mph)
- Temperature = 1,355 K (1,082 °C; 1,979 °F)
- Diameter = 1,486 mm (58.5 in)
- Length = 5,976 mm (235.3 in)
- Weight = 3,900 kg (8,600 lb)

For the high-altitude M-17 "Stratosphera" aircraft (NATO reporting name Mystic-A) a single-shaft TRD RD36-51B was created. This was a modified version of the RD36-51A engine with an unregulated nozzle and oxygen supply to the combustion chamber. The engine provided long-duration operation at an altitude of 26,000 m (85,000 ft) at low flight speed (M = 0.6).

- P = 7,000 kgf (15,000 lbf; 69,000 N)
- With beats. vsl. = 0,88 kg / kgf • h.

RD-36-51A / B was produced in a small series (about 50 units).

== Variants ==
RD-36-41
Created on the basis of the engine 'VD-19' .

Thrust – 16,150 kgf (35,600 lbf; 158,400 N)

RD-36-51
This engine was a replacement for the Kuznetsov NK-144 turbofan used on the Tu-144D SST, giving an increase in full payload range from 3,080 km to 5,330 km. It is recognizable by the translating-plug variable-area nozzle.
RD-36-51A
The RD-36-51A produced 20,000 kgf (44,000 lbf; 200,000 N) thrust at take-off and had a cruise thrust-specific fuel consumption of 1.22 kg/(kgf. h). which gave the aircraft a maximum range of 6,500 km.
RD-36-51B
Non-afterburning turbojet for use in high-altitude reconnaissance/research aircraft, such as the Myasishchev M-17 Stratosphera.

== Applications ==
- Tupolev Tu-148 (RD-36-41)
- Sukhoi T-4 (RD-36-41)
- Tupolev Tu-144D (RD-36-51A)
- Myasishchev M-17 Stratosphera (RD-36-51B)

== Specifications (RD-36-51A) ==
==== General characteristics ====
- Type: Turbojet
- Length: 5.976 m (235.3 in)
- Diameter: 1.486 m (58.5 in)
- Dry weight: 3,900 kg (8,600 lb)

==== Components ====
- Compressor: Axial

==== Performance ====
- Maximum thrust: 24,000 kgf (53,000 lbf; 240,000 N) at takeoff and 5,400 kgf (12,000 lbf; 53,000 N) cruise
- Overall pressure ratio: 16.1
- Specific fuel consumption: 35 g/(kN·s)) 1.23 lb/(lbf·h)

== See also ==
Comparable engines

- Rolls-Royce/Snecma Olympus 593

Related lists

- List of aircraft engines
