= Beriev S-13 =

Soviet reverse-engineered copy of the Lockheed U-2C

S-13

General information
- Type: High-altitude reconnaissance aircraft
- National origin: Soviet Union
- Designer: Beriev
- Status: Development ceased
- Number built: 0 (1 unfinished prototype)

History
- Developed from: Lockheed U-2

The Beriev S-13 was a Soviet reverse-engineered copy of the Lockheed U-2C, developed in the Soviet Union in the early 1960s.

== History ==
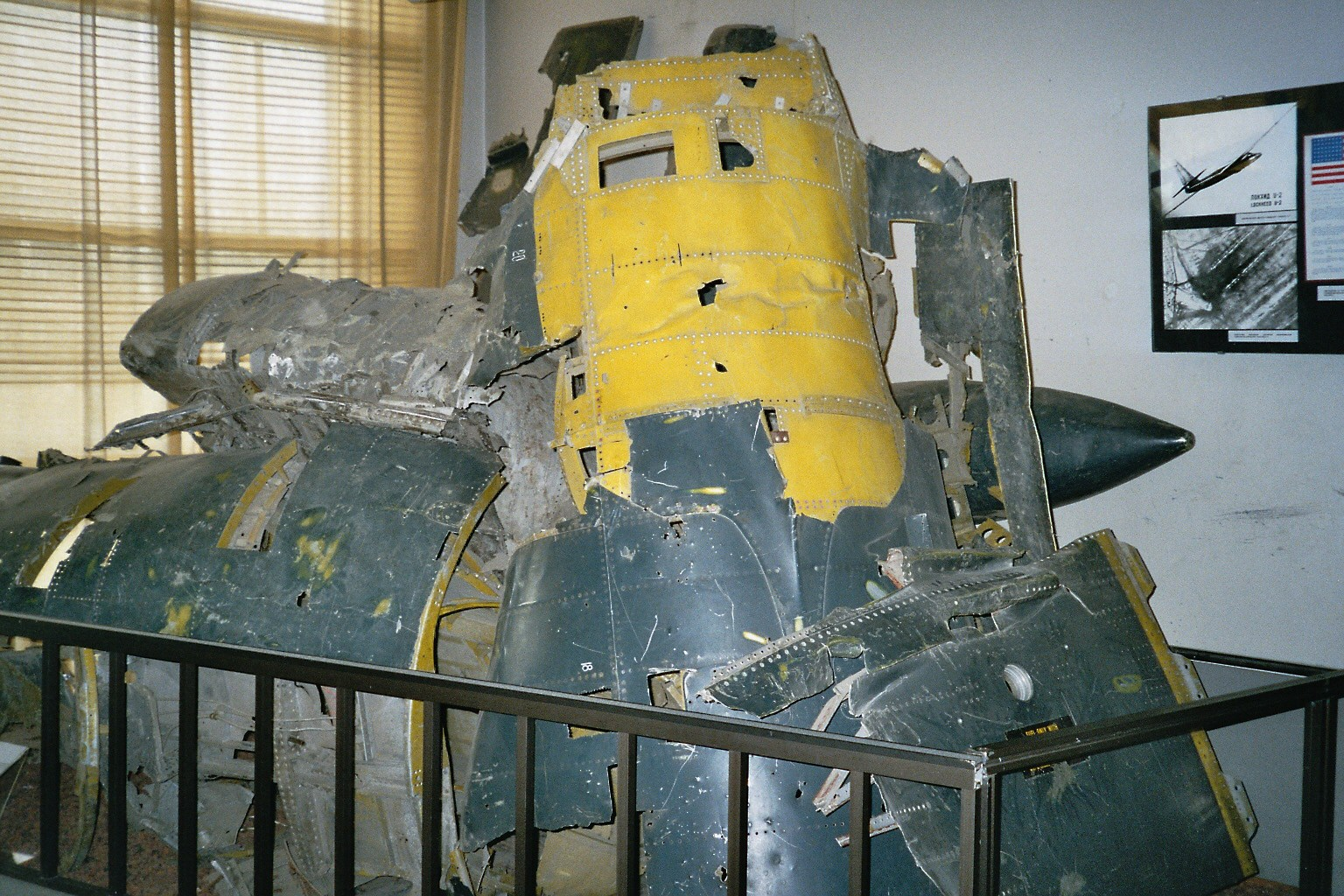
Wreckage of the U-2 flown by Francis Gary Powers in an exhibition at the Central Museum of the Armed Forces in Moscow

On 1 May 1960, Francis Gary Powers flew a U-2 espionage mission from northern Pakistan over the Soviet Union. While flying over the Urals, the aircraft came within range of Soviet surface-to-air missiles. The U-2 was hit by an S-75 Dvina missile (NATO code name: SA-2 Guideline) and broke apart, but the debris remained relatively intact. The Soviet Union had its own comparable high altitude reconnaissance aircraft, the Yakovlev Yak-25RV, but for political reasons this high-altitude reconnaissance aircraft was not used outside the borders of the Soviet Union and its main function was to emulate the U-2 to train Soviet air defence forces. The Yakovlev Yak-25RV was unable to reach the U-2's ceiling of 21,335–25,900 m (69,997–84,974 ft).

After the U-2 shootdown, the wreckage was examined by Soviet aviation specialists. The investigation, conducted by Georgy Beriev of OKB-49 at Taganrog, led to a decision of the Council of Ministers of the Soviet Union on 28 June 1960 that the aircraft and its Pratt & Whitney J75-P-13 engine should be copied. OKB-16 in Kazan, led by Professor F. Zubets, reverse-engineered the engine under the designation RD-16-75. On 23 August 1960, the USSR Council of Ministers ordered five aircraft (to be designated S-13), two of which were to be made available to the Air Force after completing trial flights.

The timetable was very tight, as it was planned to examine all the components of the U-2 and to copy them while following the standards of Soviet military aviation, including the AFA-60 camera system. The S-13 was to be used for aerial reconnaissance, for weather research and as a balloon interceptor.

On 1 April 1961, the first fuselage was completed. However, on 12 May 1962 the Council of Ministers cancelled the project with immediate effect, when it was realized that the United States and its allies, like the Soviet Union, could shoot down slow-moving targets even at high altitude. For large-scale, long-term surveillance, spy satellites were a better solution. For short-term, ad hoc reconnaissance, the Soviet Union, like the United States with the Lockheed SR-71 Blackbird, preferred high-speed reconnaissance aircraft, such as the Tsybin RSR. Although no S-13 aircraft was actually completed, the S-13 program gave valuable insights into alloys, materials and processing methods that were subsequently utilized in new Soviet aircraft designs. Parts of the U-2 were exhibited in the Central Museum of the Armed Forces at Monino in Moscow.

== Specifications ==
General characteristics

- Crew: 1
- Length: 15.7 m (51 ft 6 in)
- Wingspan: 24.38 m (80 ft 0 in)
- Empty weight: 5,900 kg (13,007 lb)
- Gross weight: 11,000 kg (24,251 lb)
- Powerplant: 1 × Zubets RD-16-15 Turbojet, 110.853 kN (24,921 lbf) thrust

Performance

- Maximum speed: 850 km/h (530 mph, 460 kn) estimated
- Range: 6,400 km (4,000 mi, 3,500 nmi)
- Service ceiling: 24,000 m (79,000 ft)

== See also ==
- Lockheed U-2
- Yakovlev Yak-25RV
- Myasishchev M-55
- MiG-25R
- S-75 Dvina
- Beriev
