= Myasishchev M-101T =

Russian passenger aircraft

M-101T
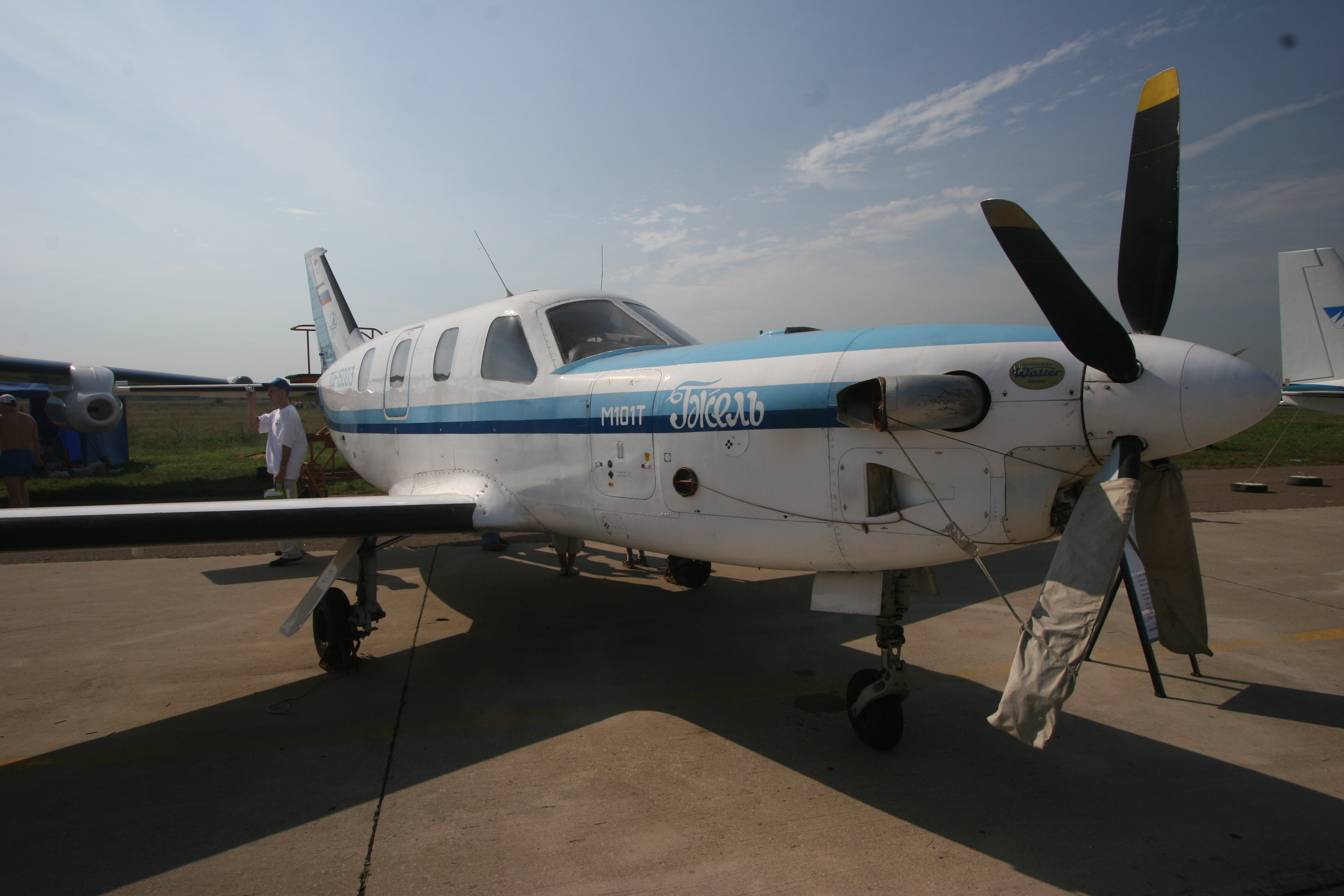
- An M-101T at 2007 MAKS Airshow

General information
- Type: Passenger and cargo aircraft
- National origin: Russia
- Manufacturer: Myasishchev

History
- First flight: 31 March 1995

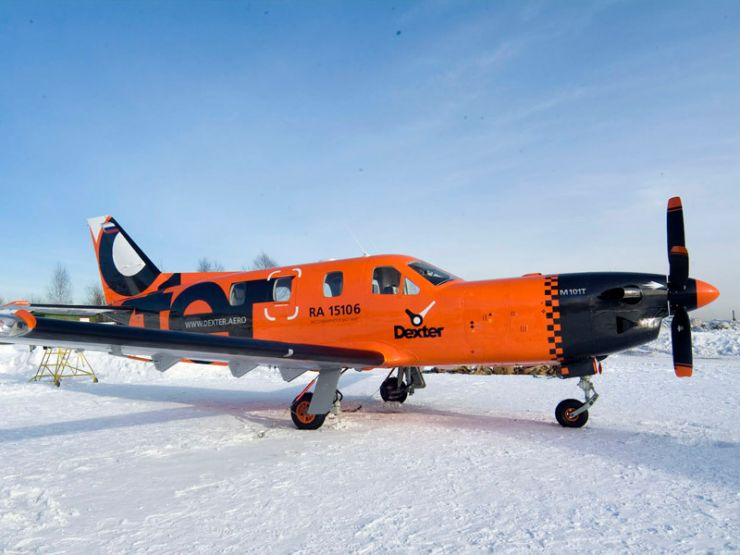
An M-101T air taxi operated by Dexter Air Taxi

The Myasishchev M-101T is a Russian business class aircraft, designed by Myasishchev and built by Sokol. The aircraft was first flown on 31 March 1995.

== Operators ==
Russia

- Dexter Air Taxi (3 aircraft).
- 3 more aircraft operated by Buguruslansk Civil Aviation School.
- 1 aircraft RA15106, was demonstrated in 2004 in South Africa by ROSAVIA and flown at multiple airshows in South Africa. These demonstrations were flown by Yurij Polyakov and South African born Andrew Cross. The project generated a lot of interest but did not sell because the asking price was too high. When the project ended the aircraft was ferried back to Russia by Yurij Polyakov.

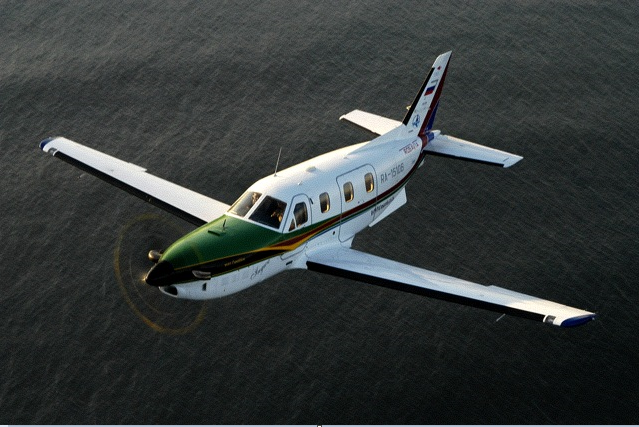
Andrew Cross pilots M-101T over the sea near Umhlanga Rocks Kwazulu Natal South Africa in 2004

== Specifications ==
Data from Brassey's World Aircraft & Systems Directory 1999/2000

General characteristics

- Crew: 1
- Capacity: 7 passengers / 540 kg (1,190 lb) payload
- Length: 9.975 m (32 ft 9 in)
- Wingspan: 13 m (42 ft 8 in)
- Height: 3.72 m (12 ft 2 in)
- Wing area: 17.06 m^{2} (183.6 sq ft)
- Aspect ratio: 9.906
- Empty weight: 2,016 kg (4,445 lb)
- Max takeoff weight: 3,000 kg (6,614 lb)
- Powerplant: 1 × Walter M601F turboprop engine, 567 kW (760 hp)

Performance

- Maximum speed: 525 km/h (326 mph, 283 kn)
- Cruise speed: 360–450 km/h (220–280 mph, 190–240 kn) at 7,600 m (24,900 ft)
- Stall speed: 112–125 km/h (70–78 mph, 60–67 kn)
- Range: 1,410 km (880 mi, 760 nmi)
- Time to altitude: 7,600 m (24,900 ft) in 25 minutes

== See also ==
Aircraft of comparable role, configuration, and era

- Aero Ae 270 Spirit
- Pilatus PC-12
- Piper Meridian
- SOCATA TBM
