= Myasishchev VM-T =

Conversion of Soviet M-4 Molot bomber to carry outsized cargo

VM-T Atlant
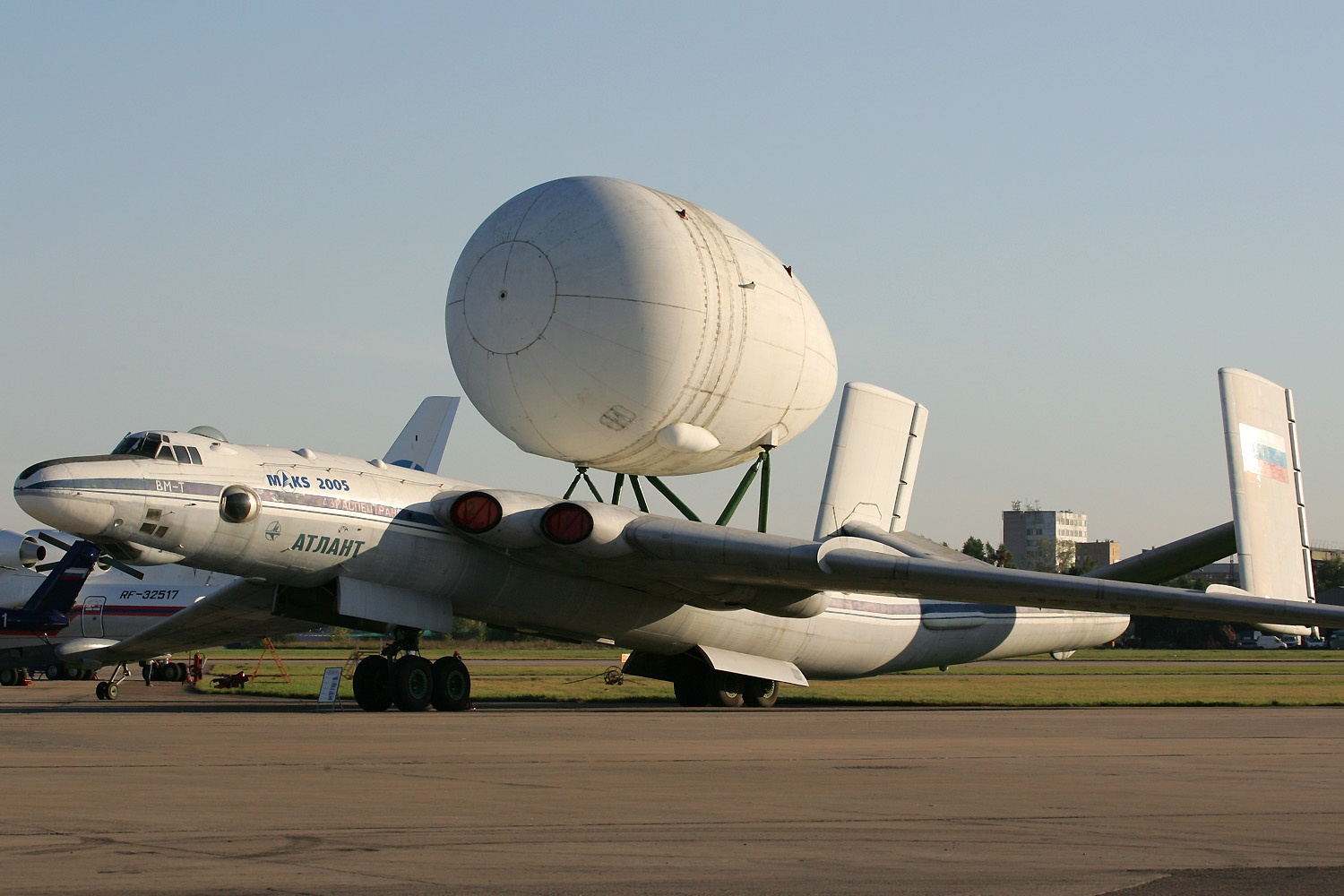
- VM-T with the 3GT payload container at the Zhukovsky Air Show in 2005

General information
- Type: Outsize cargo transport
- Manufacturer: Myasishchev
- Designer: Vladimir Mikhailovich Myasishchev
- Status: Retired
- Primary users: Soviet Air Force Russian Federal Space Agency (Soviet space program)
- Number built: 2

History
- Introduction date: January 1982
- First flight: 29 April 1981
- Retired: 1989
- Developed from: Myasishchev M-4

The Myasishchev VM-T Atlant (Russian: Мясищев ВМ-Т «Атлант» ("Atlas"), with the "VM-T" ("BM-T") standing for Vladimir Myasishchev – Transport) was a variant of Myasishchev's M-4 Molot bomber (the "3M"), re-purposed as a strategic-airlift airplane. The VM-T was modified to carry rocket boosters and the Soviet space shuttles of the Buran program. It is also known as the 3M-T.

== Design and development ==
The design was conceived in 1978 when Myasishchev was asked to solve the problem of transporting rockets and other large space vehicles to the Baikonur Cosmodrome. Engineers used an old 3M (a modified M-4 bomber) and replaced the empennage with dihedral horizontal stabilizers having large, rectangular end-plate tailfins to accommodate payloads measuring as large as twice the diameter of the aircraft's fuselage. A large, aerodynamically optimized cargo container, placed on top of the aircraft, would contain the freight. In addition, a new control system was added to the plane to compensate for the added weight.

The Atlant first flew in 1981 and made its first flight with cargo in January 1982. Its main task was to ferry Energia rocket boosters from their development plant to the Baikonur Cosmodrome. On several occasions, the then-incomplete Soviet space shuttle Buran was piggybacked to the Cosmodrome as well.

Two Atlants were built. They were replaced in 1989 by Antonov's An-225 Mriya. One Atlant (RF-01502) is kept at the Zhukovsky International Airport in Russia owned by TsAGI and Gromov Flight Research Institute, the other one (RA-01402) at Dyagilevo (air base) in Ryazan.

=== Cargo configurations ===
0GT was the Buran spaceplane without tailplane and equipment, 1GT was the hydrogen tank of the Energia rocket, 2GT was the engine section, instrument section, and the liquid oxygen tank of the Energia core stage, and 3GT was the protective covers for the 1GT and 2GT payloads. All configurations were equipped with aerodynamic covers to decrease the drag.

== Specifications (VM-T) ==
Data from Jane's aircraft recognition guide 1996, VM-T Atlant's mains characteristics,

General characteristics

- Crew: 6
- Capacity:

- 0GT payload container 45,300 kg (99,869 lb) - (38.45 m (126 ft) long, 23.8 m (78 ft) Buran wingspan)
- 1GT payload container 31,500 kg (69,446 lb) - (44.46 m (146 ft) long, 7.78 m (26 ft) diameter)
- 2GT payload container 30,000 kg (66,139 lb) - (26.41 m (87 ft) long, 7.75 m (25 ft) diameter)
- 3GT payload container 15,000 kg (33,069 lb) - (16.67 m (55 ft) long, 7.75 m (25 ft) diameter)

- Length: 51.23 m (168 ft 1 in)
- Wingspan: 53.14 m (174 ft 4 in)
- Wing area: 351.78 m^{2} (3,786.5 sq ft)
- Empty weight: 81,200 kg (179,015 lb) no container

- 0GT payload container 126,500 kg (278,885 lb)
- 1GT payload container 112,700 kg (248,461 lb)
- 2GT payload container 111,200 kg (245,154 lb)
- 3GT payload container 96,200 kg (212,085 lb)

- Max takeoff weight: 139,200 kg (306,883 lb) no container

- 0GT payload container 187,000 kg (412,264 lb)
- 1GT payload container 170,500 kg (375,888 lb)
- 2GT payload container 169,000 kg (372,581 lb)
- 3GT payload container 152,200 kg (335,544 lb)

- Maximum landing weight:

- 0GT payload container 138,500 kg (305,340 lb)
- 1GT payload container 129,500 kg (285,499 lb)
- 2GT payload container 128,000 kg (282,192 lb)
- 3GT payload container 111,200 kg (245,154 lb)

- Powerplant: 4 × RKBM/Koliesov / Dobrynin VD-7MD turbojet engines, 105.45 kN (23,710 lbf) thrust each

Performance

- Cruise speed: 580 km/h (360 mph, 310 kn)
- Never exceed speed: 970 km/h (600 mph, 520 kn)
- Range: 3,565 km (2,215 mi, 1,925 nmi)
- Service ceiling: 10,200 m (33,500 ft)
- Thrust/weight: 0.224 (at MTOW)
- Take-off run: 3,500 m (11,483 ft) with 1GT container

== See also ==
Related development

- Myasishchev M-4

Aircraft of comparable role, configuration, and era

- Antonov An-124
- Antonov An-225
- Boeing 747 Shuttle Carrier Aircraft
- Boeing 747-8
- Airbus Beluga
- Boeing 747 Large Cargo Freighter
