= Myasishchev M-4 =

Soviet strategic bomber and tanker aircraft

M-4 / 3M Molot
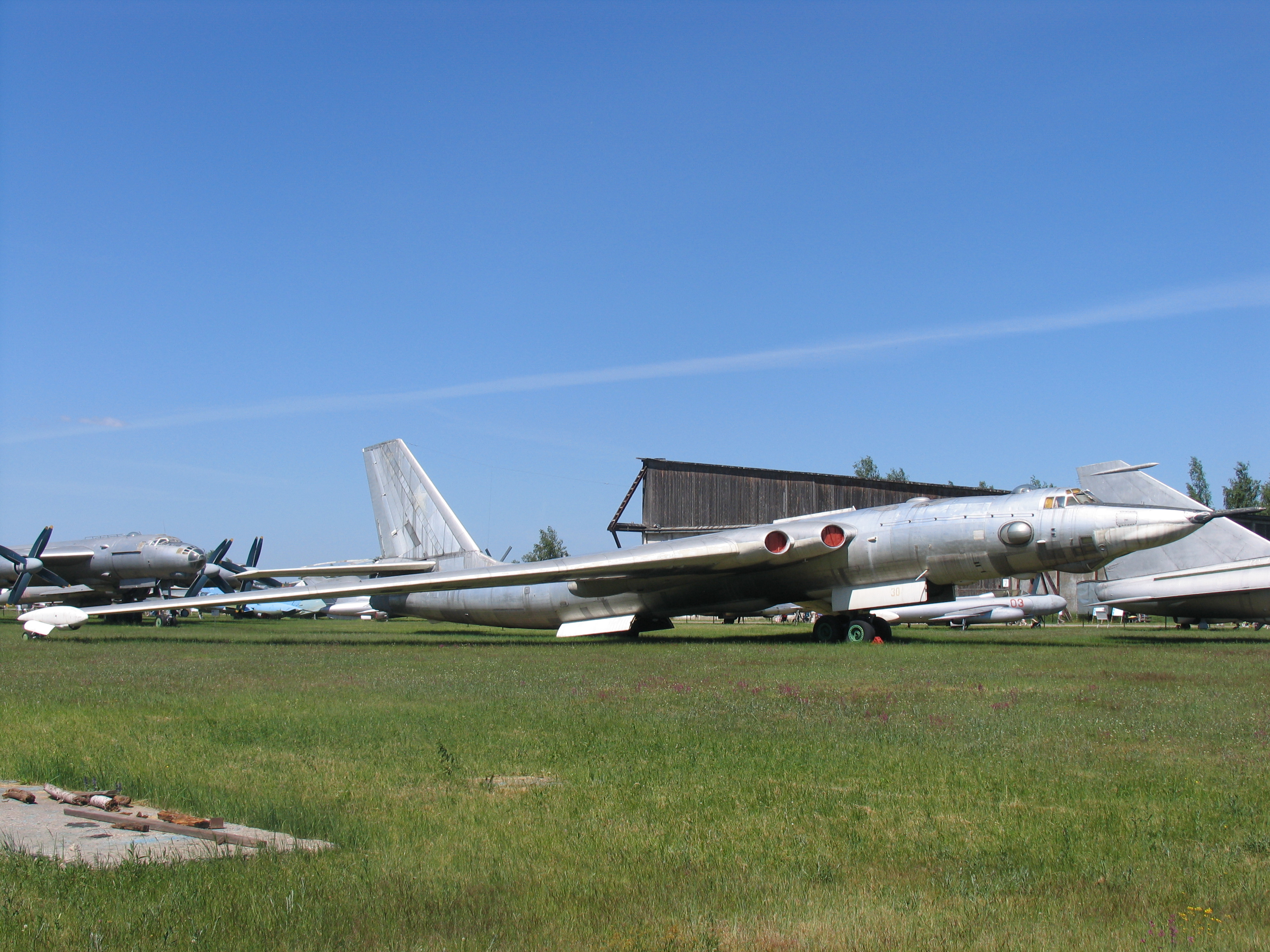
- Myasishchev 3MD at Monino Central Air Force Museum (Moscow)

General information
- Type: Strategic bomber
- National origin: Soviet Union
- Manufacturer: Myasishchev
- Primary users: Soviet Air Force Soviet Navy; Russian Air Force
- Number built: 2 prototypes, 123

History
- Manufactured: 125
- Introduction date: 1956 (M-4/2M); 1958 (M-6/3M)
- First flight: 20 January 1953 (M-4/2M); 1956 (M-6/3M)
- Retired: 1994
- Variant: Myasishchev VM-T

The Myasishchev M-4 Molot (Russian: Молот (Hammer), USAF/DoD reporting name "Type 37", ASCC reporting name Bison) was a four-engined strategic bomber designed by Vladimir Mikhailovich Myasishchev and manufactured by the Soviet Union in the 1950s to provide a Long Range Aviation bomber capable of attacking targets in North America.

The aircraft fell well short of its intended range and was not fully capable of attacking the most valuable targets in the United States. As this became clear, production was shut down. In spite of the failure to produce a capable strategic design and the resulting small numbers, the M-4 nevertheless sparked fears of a "bomber gap" when 18 of the aircraft were flown in a public demonstration on May Day in 1954. The US responded by building thousands of Boeing B-47s and B-52s to counter this perceived threat.

The design was updated with more efficient engines, inflight refuelling (IFR) support and the removal of the glass nose for optical bombing and moving the radar to this location. With these changes, production restarted as the 3M. Even with these modifications the design was not truly effective in the nuclear bomber role, and only 125 aircraft, both M-4s and 3Ms, were produced before the production line was shut down for good in 1963. Only 19 of these served on nuclear alert.

M-4s and 3Ms were primarily used as long-range maritime reconnaissance and strike aircraft and other supporting roles. Most were converted in the 1970s and 80s to tanker aircraft, especially as the Tupolev Tu-22M took over the maritime missions. The tanker conversions remained in service until 1994. Most surviving examples were broken up as part of post-Cold War arms limitations agreements.

The M-4 was the first four-engine jet bomber deployed operationally by the Soviet Union.

== Design and development ==
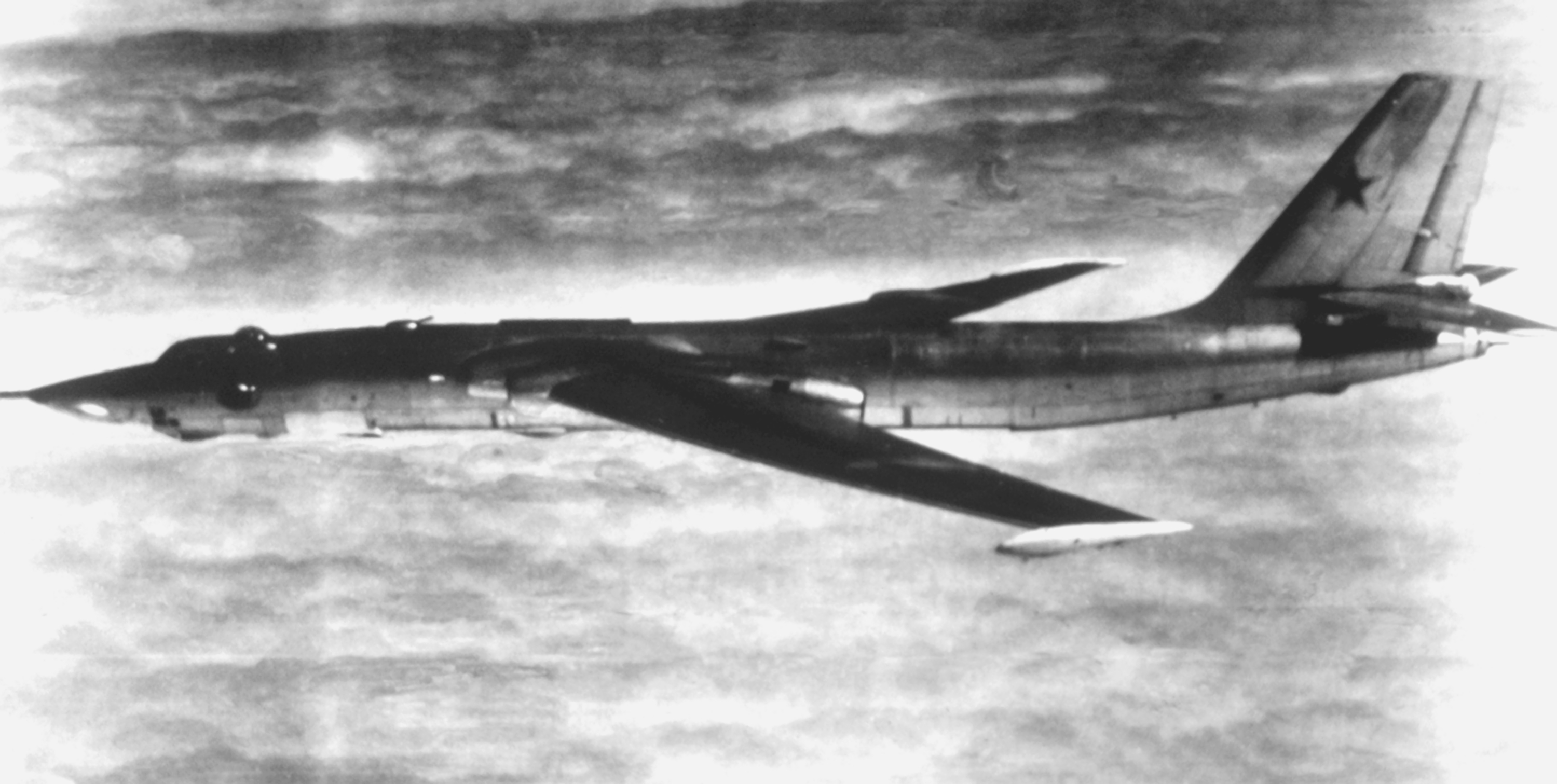
A Soviet Myasishchev 3MD in 1982

Following World War II, the Soviet Union prioritized developing a long-range strategic bomber capable of delivering atomic weapons. Their first aircraft was the Tupolev Tu-4, a reverse-engineered version of the American B-29 Superfortress. The Tu-4 was only ever a stop-gap solution, as unlike the American strategic bomber force that could operate from bases in allied countries close to the USSR, it lacked the range to reach the continental United States, and experiences in the Korean War demonstrated piston engine bombers were extremely vulnerable to jet fighter interception. With the advancement of Western jet bombers like the B-47 Stratojet and Vickers Valiant, Vladimir Mikhailovich Myasishchev was directed to construct a strategichesky dalny bombardirovshchik (SDB) (стратегический дальный бомбардировщик (СДБ), "strategic long-range bomber") in spring of 1951. The first M-4 (Bison-A) prototype flew on 20 January 1953, and was handed over to state acceptance trials in March 1954, with production beginning later that year. It entered service in 1955, with 34 being built including two prototypes.

The M-4 was made mostly of aircraft aluminum alloys with some steel and magnesium components. It had wings swept at 35-degrees and powered initially by four Mikulin AM-3A engines with a maximum thrust of 85.8 kN (8,750 kgp; 19,290 lbf), but later upgraded to RD-3M-500 turbojets with a maximum thrust of 93.2 kN (9,500 kgp; 20,940 lbf). There were 18 bladder fuel tanks in the fuselage and wings, providing a total fuel capacity of 123,600 liters (32,610 US gallons); this gave the aircraft a range of 9,500 km (5,900 mi), although this fell short of the 12,000 km (7,500 mi) range initially specified. It had a payload of 24 tonnes (26.4 tons) in various configurations. Defensive armament consisted of six AM-23 23 mm cannons with a rate of fire of 1,250 rpm each in a manned twin tail turret with 400 rounds per gun and two twin remote controlled turrets in the top and bottom fuselage with 300 rounds per gun each. The aircraft had a crew of eight: a navigator/bombardier in the nose; pilot and copilot in the cockpit; radar operator/navigator, flight engineer/gunner, radio operator/gunner, and dorsal turret gunner in a compartment behind the cockpit; and a tail gunner.

=== 3M ===
While the M-4 had less range than the Tupolev Tu-95, it had greater speed and payload, sufficient advantages to continue improving on the design. In 1954, approval was granted for a redesign of the M-4, which flew on 27 March 1956 and began state trials in early 1958. The 3M "Bison-B" was powered by four Dobrynin RD-7 turbojets, which had the same thrust as the RD-3M but were 25% more fuel efficient; a nose inflight refueling probe was also added to further increase range. The center fuselage was considerably redesigned to reduce weight and improve aerodynamics, and the wings were updated with a wider span and area. 74 Bison-Bs would be built.

=== Tanker ===
From the outset when the M-4's range shortfall became apparent, Myasishchev began investigating inflight refueling (IFR). In 1955, the second production aircraft was modified to a probe-and-drogue tanker configuration and the first production aircraft was fitted with an IFR probe above the nose, with two more converted for trials the following year. From the late 1950s, the M-4 fleet was converted to the tanker configuration through the fit of a hose-drum unit (HDU) and fuel tanks in the bomb bay and removal of all defensive armament. Similar conversions were performed to the 3M fleet in the 1970s and 1980s, the 3MS-1 "Bison-B" becoming the "3MS-2" tanker and the 3MN-1 becoming the "3MN-2" tanker.

== Operational history ==
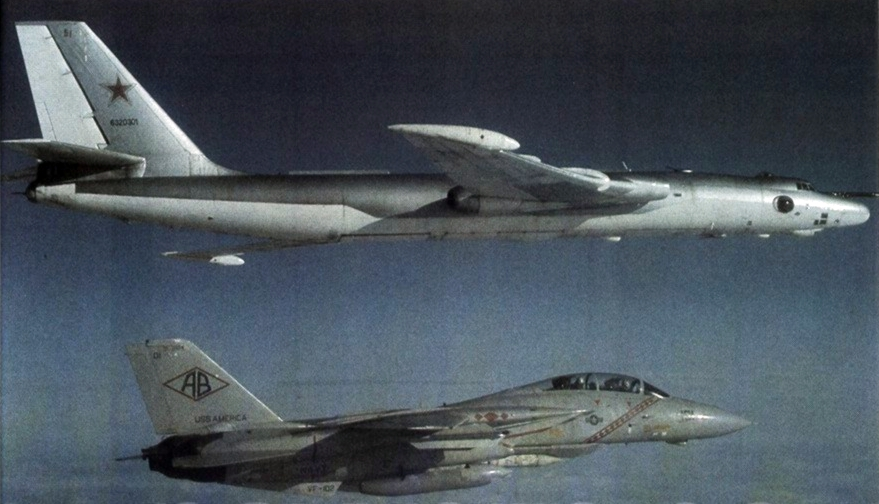
A U.S. Navy Tomcat intercepting a Myasishchev 3M, 1983

The M-4 was first displayed to the public in Red Square, on May Day, 1954. The aircraft was a surprise to the United States, which had not known that the Soviets had built a jet bomber. However, it soon became clear that the bomber had an insufficient range to attack the United States and still return to the Soviet Union. Only a few of the original production M-4s were actually put into service. To remedy this problem, the Myasishchev design bureau introduced the 3M, known to the West as the 'Bison-B', which was considerably more powerful than the previous version. This new model first flew in 1955. Among other things, two of the five original gun barbettes were removed to lighten the aircraft and reduce drag.

In July 1955 American observers saw 28 Bisons in two groups during a Soviet air show. The United States government believed that the bomber was in mass production, and the Central Intelligence Agency estimated that 800 would be available by 1960. The display was a hoax; the first group of ten repeated the flyby with eight more. The classified estimates led, however, to American politicians warning of a "bomber gap".

The new airplane was not for the Soviet Air Force (VVS), but rather for the Naval Aviation (AV-MF). Though it could still not bomb Washington, D.C., the 3M had a sufficient range to fulfill the need for a long-range maritime patrol aircraft. In 1959, the 3M broke numerous world records for payload to height, including 10,000 kilograms (22,000 lb) to 15,317 metres (50,253 ft) and 55,220 kilograms (121,740 lb) to 2,000 metres (6,600 ft).

However, it was thought by the West (and would continue to be thought until 1961) that the 3M was the original M-4, meaning that the capability of the M-4 was vastly overestimated by Western intelligence agencies.

In the early 1960s, the 'Bison-C', with a specialized search radar, was introduced. By this time, many of the original M-4s had been converted to M-4-2 fuel tankers for aerial refueling. Later, 3Ms were converted to 3MS-2 and 3MN-2 tankers as well.

Neither the M-4 nor the 3M ever saw combat, and none were ever converted for low-altitude attack, as many American B-52s were, nor were any ever exported to the Soviet Union's allies. However, it is a different story when it comes to aerial refueling aircraft.

Production of the Bison aircraft stopped in 1963, by which time 93 of them had been built. The last aircraft, an M-4-2 fuel tanker, was withdrawn from service in 1994.

The three VM-T heavy lift aircraft were converted from 3MN-2 tankers, with very large loads carried piggy-back above the fuselage. The single vertical fin/rudder was replaced with two large rectangular fin/rudders at the tips of the horizontal stabilizers to improve control due to the turbulence caused by the cargo pod.

With the withdrawal of the Myasishchev bombers and tankers the vast majority of the retired airframes were broken up under the terms of the relevant arms limitation treaty.

== Variants ==
=== Prototype ===
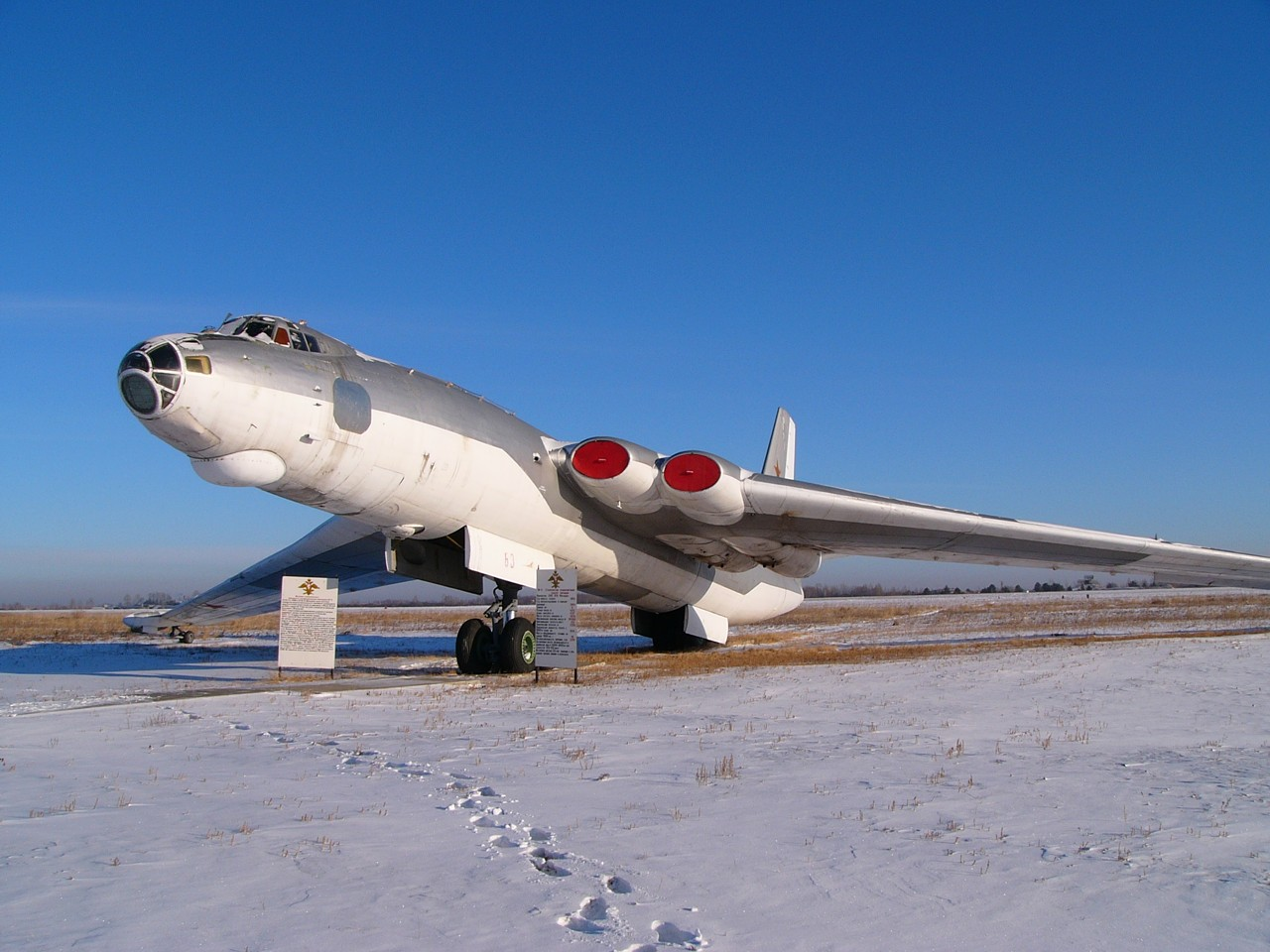
Myasishchev M-4 '63 Red' (c/n 5301518) at Ukrainka Airbase, Amur Oblast

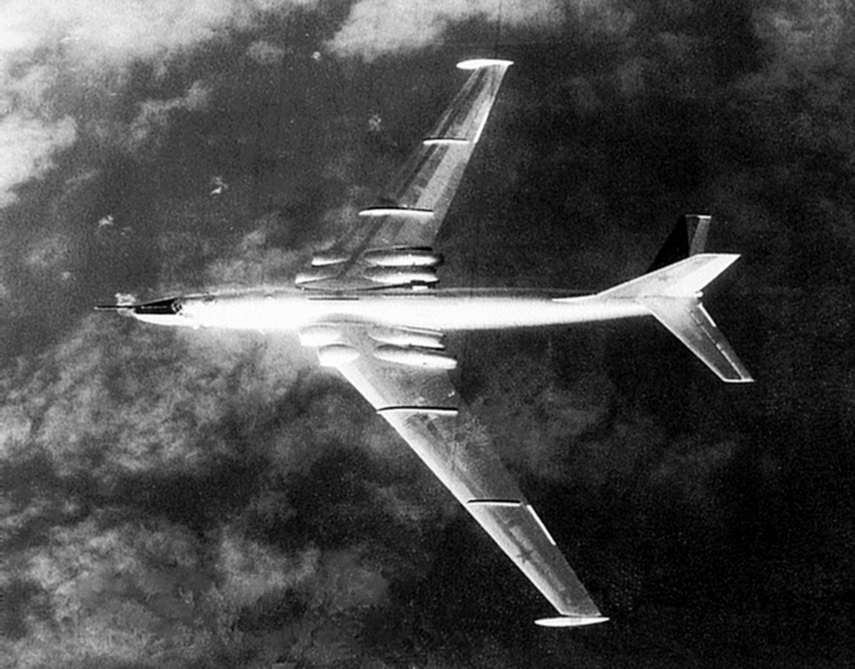
A Myasishchev 3M in 1968

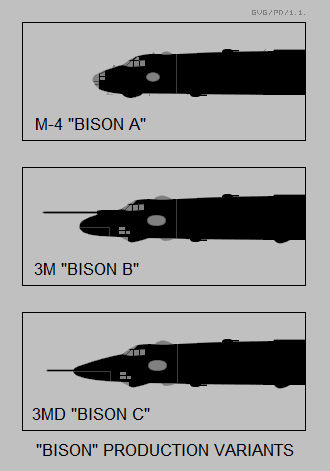
Side-view silhouette scraps of Myasishchev M-4 / 3M variant noses

- Izdeliye M (Product M) – the in-house designation for the SDB, Project 25, M-4 aircraft.
- SDB (Strategichesky Dalny Bombardirovshchik – strategic long-range bomber) – The government designation for the M-4 programme.
- [Tema Dvadtsat Pyat] Subject 25 – The VVS designation for the strategic bomber program.
- Myasishchev 3M-5 – The improved M-4 with Dobrynin VD-7 engines with higher thrust and better S.F.C. than the Mikulin AM-3A engines, configured as a launch platform for the KSR-5 air to surface missile. One prototype aircraft converted from a 3MN-1 bomber, but further conversions not carried out due to the limited life remaining on candidate aircraft. (NATO Bison-B)
- Myasishchev 3ME – A comprehensive avionics upgrade was tested on the sole 3ME, converted from a production 3M bomber (c/n 8301101). New navigation and radar equipment and a completely revised fire sensing and suppression system were also fitted. The prototype was damaged beyond repair when the Myasishchev M-50 prototype jumped its chocks during ground running of the engines, striking the 3ME killing one engineer on the 3ME. (NATO Bison-B)
- 101M - M-4 prototype.1 machine manufactured.
- 102M - This is an M-4 ground strength tester not intended for flight. 1 machine manufactured.

=== Mass production machine ===
==== Bomber type ====
- M-4 – A name used for mass-produced machines. 32 aircraft were built. (NATO Air Standards Co-ordinating Committee codename Bison-A)
- 3M – The improved M-4 with Dobrynin VD-7 engines with higher thrust and better S.F.C. than the Mikulin AM-3A engines. The first prototype was converted from an M-4.(NATO Bison-B)
- 3MD – Production cruise missile carrying aircraft for carrying the P-6, KSR or Kh-10 air to surface missiles, with only nine built in 1960 before the production line was shut down and the Myasishchev OKB dissolved. (NATO Bison-C)
- 3MS-1 (S:Starye [dvigateli] – old engines) – New production long-range bomber aircraft capable of accommodating the VD-7 engines but fitted with Mikulin RD-3M-500a, RD-3M or AM-3A engines due to a lack of flight ready VD-7's. (NATO Bison-B)
- 3MN-1 (N:Novye [dvigateli] – new engines) – The initial production version of the 3MN long-range bomber with de-rated VD-7 engines to improve reliability after compressor blade failures. (NATO Bison-B)
- 3MSR-1 (S:Starye [dvigateli], Radioapparatura – old engines, avionics [upgrade]) – New production long-range bomber aircraft capable of accommodating the VD-7 engines but fitted with Mikulin RD-3M-500a, RD-3M or AM-3A engines due to a lack of flight ready VD-7's, and fitted with an upgraded avionics suite. (NATO Bison-B)
- 3MSN-1 (N:Novye [dvigateli], Radioapparatura – new engines, avionics [upgrade]) – Several new production long-range bomber aircraft capable of accommodating the VD-7 engines but fitted with Mikulin RD-3M-500a, RD-3M or AM-3A engines due to a lack of flight ready VD-7's, and fitted with an upgraded avionics suite. (NATO Bison-B)

==== Air refueling aircraft type ====
- M-4-2 (a.k.a. M-4-II) – M-4 production aircraft converted to in-flight refueling tankers. (NATO Bison-A)
- 3MS-2 (S:Starye [dvigateli] – old engines) – New production in-flight refueling tanker aircraft capable of accommodating the VD-7 engines but fitted with Mikulin RD-3M-500a, RD-3M or AM-3A engines due to a lack of flight ready VD-7's. During the 1970s and 1980s the majority of surviving 3MS bombers were converted to 3MS-2 tankers. (NATO Bison-B)
- 3MN-2 (N:Novye [dvigateli] – new engines) – The initial production version of the 3MN in-flight refueling tanker with de-rated VD-7 engines to improve reliability after compressor blade failures. (NATO Bison-B)
- [Tema Tridtsat Shestt] Subject 36 – The government designation for the re-engined M-4. (NATO Bison-B)

==== Transport aircraft type ====
- VM-T (Vladimir Myasishchev-Transportny) – Three 3MN-2 aircraft converted for oversize cargo flights with a large cargo pod supported on struts above the fuselage and Large rectangular fins attached to the tips of the tail-plane. Notably used for transporting the Buran shuttle and Energia launch vehicle components before the Antonov An-225 became available.

=== Projected variants ===
- Myasishchev 3M-A (Atomny – nuclear) – A nuclear-powered reconnaissance derivative using an indirect heat transfer reactor in the bomb bay for nuclear gas turbines in the wing roots, with the crew housed in a windowless lead lined cockpit.
- Myasishchev 3M-M (Morskoy – naval) – A proposed flying boat with a boat hulled fuselage and floats under the wingtips.
- Myasishchev 3M-R (Razvedchik – reconnaissance) – A proposed reconnaissance aircraft carrying high-speed reconnaissance cameras.
- Myasishchev 3M-K (Kompleks – weapons system) – A proposed strategic missile carrying strike aircraft to carry the Kh-20 long range cruise missile.
- Myasishchev 3MP – The 3MP was a projected alternative quick-change tanker/bomber, to support all AV-MF receiver aircraft, based on the 3MD, which was not proceeded with due to the cessation of 3MD production and closure of the Myasishchev OKB.
- Myasishchev 3M-T (Toplivozapravshchik – refuelling tanker) – The 3M-T was an attempt to make a production convertible tanker/missile carrier version of the 3MD, for supporting the expected Myasishchev M-52 supersonic bomber, Tu-95 and the remaining 3M bombers. No hardware was produced before the OKB was closed in September 1960.
- Myasishchev M-29 – The M-29 also known as the M-6p, is a projected airliner based on the M-4 and no known airframes were produced.

== Operators ==
Soviet Union

- Long Range Aviation, Soviet Air Forces
  - 1230th Aviation Regiment of Tanker Aircraft, Engels airfield, Saratov Oblast.
- Soviet Naval Aviation

Russia

- Russian Air Force

== Aircraft on display ==
Four aircraft are known to survive:

- 3MD '30 Red' (c/n 6302831) in the Central Russian Air Force Museum at Monino, Moscow Oblast
- M-4 '60 Red' (c/n 0301804) in the Long Range Aviation museum at Dyagilevo, Ryazan Oblast
- M-4 '63 Red' (c/n 5301518) at Ukrainka, Amur Oblast
- 3MS-2 '14 Red' (c/n 7300805) at Engels-2, Saratov Oblast

== Specifications (M-4) ==
Myasishchev M-4

Data from Grant and Dailey

General characteristics

- Crew: 8
- Length: 47.2 m (154 ft 10 in)
- Wingspan: 50.5 m (165 ft 8 in)
- Height: 14.1 m (46 ft 3 in)
- Wing area: 326.35 m^{2} (3,512.8 sq ft)
- Empty weight: 79,700 kg (175,708 lb)
- Gross weight: 138,500 kg (305,340 lb)
- Max takeoff weight: 181,500 kg (400,139 lb)
- Powerplant: 4 × Mikulin AM-3A turbojets, 85.75 kN (19,280 lbf) thrust each

Performance

- Maximum speed: 947 km/h (588 mph, 511 kn)
- Range: 5,600 km (3,500 mi, 3,000 nmi)
- Ferry range: 8,100 km (5,000 mi, 4,400 nmi)
- Service ceiling: 11,000 m (36,000 ft)
- Wing loading: 425 kg/m^{2} (87 lb/sq ft)
- Thrust/weight: 0.25

Armament

- Guns: 9 × 23 mm NR-23 cannon or 6 × 23 mm AM-23 cannon in ventral, dorsal and tail barbettes. 1,100 rounds in ventral and dorsal barbettes, 2,000 rounds in tail barbette.
- Missiles: Up to four cruise missiles carried externally.
- Bombs: Typically 12,000 kg (26,000 lb) of internal stores. Up to 24,000 kg (53,000 lb) could be carried, including nuclear and conventional bombs:
  - two nuclear bombs, or
  - two 9000 kg FAB-9000 or 5000 kg FAB-5000 general purpose bombs, or
  - four 6000 kg BRAB-6000 armor-piercing bombs, or
  - six 3000 kg FAB-3000 general purpose bombs, or
  - 28 x 500 kg FAB-500 general purpose bombs, or
  - 52 x 250 kg FAB-250 or 100 kg FAB-100 general purpose bombs

== See also ==
Related development

- Myasishchev VM-T

Aircraft of comparable role, configuration, and era

- Boeing B-52 Stratofortress
- Convair YB-60
- Tupolev Tu-16
- Handley Page Victor
- Tupolev Tu-95

Related lists

- List of military aircraft of the Soviet Union and the CIS
