= Myasishchev =

Soviet aerospace design bureau

- Formerly: OKB-23
- Industry: Aerospace
- Founded: 1951; 75 years ago
- Founder: Vladimir Mikhailovich Myasishchev
- Headquarters: Moscow, Russia
- Products: Aircraft, missiles
- Parent: United Aircraft Corporation

V. M. Myasishchev Experimental Design Bureau (Экспериментальный Машиностроительный Завод им. В. М. Мясищева) or OKB-23, founded in 1951 by MGB UdSSR Vladimir Myasishchev, was one of the chief Soviet aerospace design bureaus until its dissolution in 1960. Vladimir Myasishchev went on to head TsAGI. In 1967, Myasishchev left TsAGI and recreated his bureau, which still exists to this day. The bureau prefix was "M." As of 2003, its workforce is estimated at approximately one thousand. Myasishchev and NPO Molniya intend to use the V-MT or M-55 as launch vehicle for sub-orbital spaceflight.

In July 2014, the merger of Myasishchev and Ilyushin to create a single modern production complex was announced by the Board of Directors of OAO Il.

== Products ==
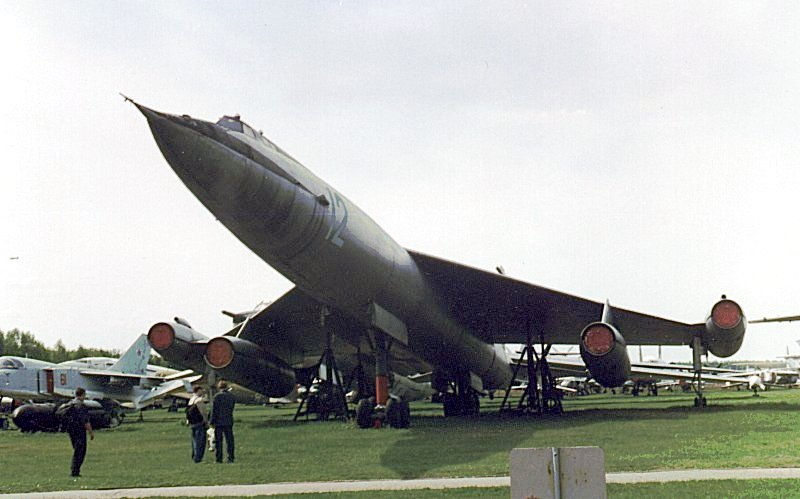
Myasishchev M-50

=== 1940-1960 ===
- VM-1/DVB-102: prototype long-range, high-altitude bomber, 1940
  - VM-2: projected version of VM-1 with M-20 diesel engines, 1940
  - VM-3/DVB-102N: projected version powered by M-120TK engines, 1940
  - VM-4: prototype version powered by M-71TK-3 engines, 1943
  - VM-5/DVB-102DM: projected version powered by MB-102TK engines, 1942
- VM-6/Pe-2M-1: Pe-2 with M-1 engines, 1943
- VM-7/Pe-2B
- VM-8/Pe-2D (Pe-6)
- VM-9/Pe-2S
- VM-10/Pe-3M
- VM-11/Pe-2K
- VM-12/Pe-2I
- VM-13/Pe-2M
- VM-14/DIS: long-range escort fighter prototype, 1945
- VM-15/Pe-2RD
- VM-16/DB-108: long-range bomber prototype developed from the Pe-2, 1944
- VM-17/DB-II-108: prototype three crew version of VM-16, 1945
- VM-18: prototype four crew version of VM-16 with increased length and wingspan, 1945
- VM-19/VB-109: VM-17 rebuilt for two crew and same wingspan as the VM-16 and VM-17, 1945
- VM-20/Pe-2F
- VM-21/Pe-2R
- VM-22/DVB-202: projected four-engine strategic long-range, high-altitude bomber, 1944
- VM-23/DVB-302: projected four-engine strategic long-range, high-altitude bomber, 1945
- VM-24/RB-17: projected tactical jet bomber, 1945
- M-25/M-4 "Bison": company designation for M-4
- M-26 (I): M-4 powered by VD-7 engines, 1951
- M-26 (II): projected four-engine military transport aircraft, 1960
- M-27: projected two or four engine jet airliner, 1952
- M-28/2M: four-engine high-altitude bomber, 1951
- M-29/M-6P: projected airliner derived from the M-4, 1953
- M-30 (I): projected high-altitude reconnaissance aircraft, 1953
- M-30 (II): nuclear powered canard wing supersonic bomber, 1959
- M-31: projected transonic strategic bomber, 1952
- M-32: projected delta-wing supersonic strategic bomber, 1953
- M-33: Yak-1000 development, 1951
- M-34: transonic bomber, 1953
- M-36: company designation for 3M
- M-39: 3M powered by VD-7V turbojets, 1957
- M-50 "Bounder" prototype supersonic bomber, 1954
- M-51: unmanned M-50, 1956
- M-52: supersonic strategic missile carrier developed from the M-50, 1956
- M-53: projected SST, 1958
- M-54: tailless delta-wing supersonic strategic missile carrier, 1959
- M-55: various SST studies, 1958
- M-56: canard or delta supersonic strategic missile carrier, 1956, very similar to XB-70
- M-57: nuclear powered bomber project, 1959
- M-58: tailless supersonic bomber, 1958
- M-59: canard wing supersonic missile carrier, 1959
- M-60: nuclear powered bomber project developed from the M-50, 1955
- M-70: supersonic flying boat, 1955

=== 1967-present ===
- M-12: STOL/VTOL utility aircraft, 1968
- M-13: military transport, 1968
- M-17 "Mystic-A": high-altitude reconnaissance aircraft, 1970
- M-18: supersonic bomber design, 1972; cancelled in favor of the Tupolev Tu-160
- M-19: hypersonic air and space plane; various engine and fuel types, 1974
- M-20: strategic multi-regime supersonic bomber, many aerodynamic configurations, 1968
- M-25: supersonic attack aircraft, used its own shockwave as a weapon, 1969
- M-35/VM-T: 2 M-4s converted to carry the space shuttle Buran, 1977
- M-52 eight-engine heavy transport aircraft, 1979
- M-55 "Mystic-B": high-altitude research and reconnaissance aircraft, 1985
- M-60: widebody airliner projects; many variants, 1985–2003
- M-61/M-17PV: development of M-17, 1984
- M-62 Oryol: high-altitude remote-controlled drone, 1975
- M-63: high-altitude aircraft, 1981
- M-65/M-17P: M-17 development, 1986
- M-67: high-altitude observation aircraft, 1987
- M-70 Gzhel: single-engine business/executive transport aircraft, 1989; renamed to M-101
- M-72 Yamal twin-engine amphibious aircraft, 1989
- M-80 two or four-engine VTOL transport aircraft, 1994
- M-90 Air Ferry: very heavy multi-purpose transport project, 1992. Not built.
- M-101 Gzhel: single-engine business/executive transport aircraft, 1992
- M-102 Duet: twin-engine business/executive transport aircraft, 1989
- M-103 Skif: experimental heavy bomber, 1990
- M-104: project
- M-105: twin-engine business/executive transport aircraft developed from the M-102, 1994
- M-111: twin-engine business/executive transport project, revision of 1975 German AMC-111 project, 1993
- M-112: twin-engine business/executive transport aircraft, German-Russian joint project, 1993
- M-120: twin-engine business/executive transport aircraft
- M-121: twin-engine business/executive transport aircraft
- M-150: twin-engine, 150 passenger short-range airliner, 1995
- M-200 Master: military advanced trainer project, 1992. Not built.
- M-201 Sokol: twin-engine business/executive transport aircraft, 1992
- M-202 Olyon: 19 passenger twin-engine feederliner developed from the M-102, 1997
- M-203 Barsuk: single-engine light utility aircraft, 1995
- M-205: two-seat light attack aircraft, 1996
- M-207: advanced trainer developed from the M-205, 1996
- M-302 Kuryer: twin-engine business/executive transport aircraft for Iran, 1993
- M-500: agricultural utility aircraft

=== Spacecraft ===
- Space Adventures C-21
- Space Adventures M-55X
- Buran program, cockpit
- Cosmopolis XXI suborbital craft

=== Missiles ===
- RSS-40 Buran, nuclear cruise missile project
- M-44 aerospace vehicle project
- Myasishchev Project 46 spaceplane project
- Myasishchev Project 48 spaceplane project
- M-48/VKA-23 spaceplane project

== Bibliography ==
- Butowski, Piotr (July–August 1999). "Supersonic Mysasischchevs: More Details on the OKB's Frustrated Bombers". Air Enthusiast (82): 2–5. ISSN 0143-5450.
