= Myasishchev M-55 =

Soviet high-altitude reconnaissance and research aircraft

M-55 Geophysica
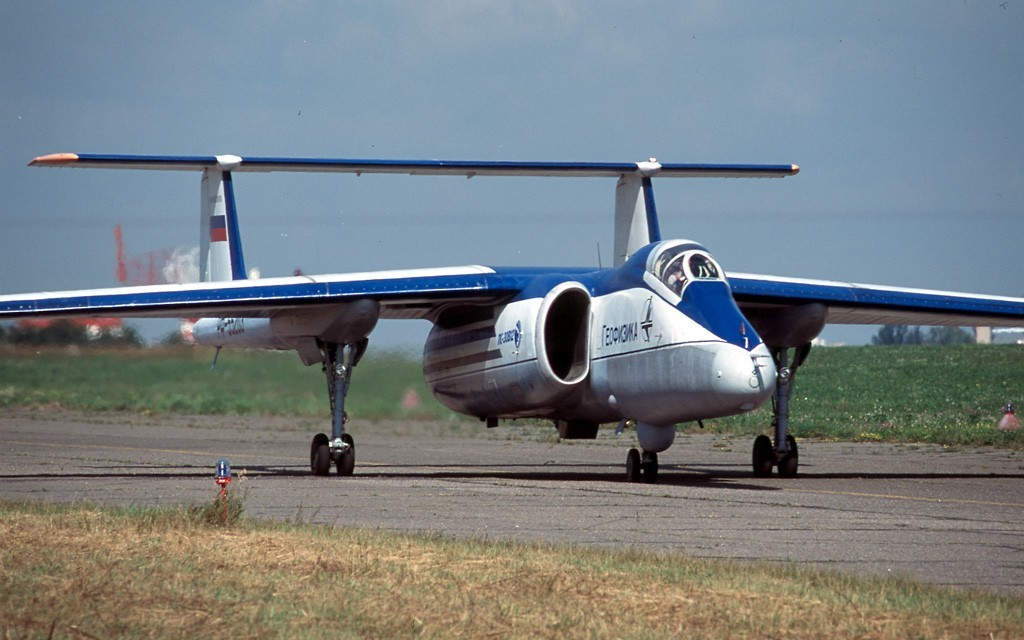
- Myasishchev M-55 Geophysica at MAKS Airshow 2001

General information
- Type: High-altitude reconnaissance
- Manufacturer: Myasishchev
- Status: Potentially returning to service
- Primary users: Soviet Air Force Russian Aerospace Forces
- Number built: Subject 34: 1 M-17: at least 2 M-55: 5

History
- First flight: Subject 34: December 1978; M-17: 26 May 1982; M-55: 16 August 1988

The Myasishchev M-55 (NATO reporting name: Mystic-B) is a high-altitude reconnaissance aircraft developed by OKB Myasishchev in the Soviet Union, similar in mission to the Lockheed U-2, but with a twin-boom fuselage and tail surface design. It is a twin-engined development of the Myasishchev M-17 Stratosphera with a higher maximum take-off weight.

== Design and development ==
During the 1950s and 1960s the United States instituted several programs using high-altitude reconnaissance balloons, released over friendly territory to ascend into the jetstream and be transported over the Soviet Union and People's Republic of China.

=== Subject 34 ===
To combat these high-altitude balloons, Myasishchev proposed Subject 34 a single-seat turbojet-powered twin-boom high-aspect-ratio aircraft. Armament of the single-seat balloon interceptor was to have been two air-air missiles (AAM) and two GSh-23 cannon with 600 rounds per gun in a dorsal turret. Before Subject 34 could be developed into operational hardware, the threat receded due to the success of the Keyhole reconnaissance satellites of the Corona program and the emergence of the Lockheed A-12.

The first prototype of Subject 34 was completed in secret at the Kumertau helicopter plant in Bashkirya, but whilst carrying out taxi tests in December 1978, the prototype Chaika piloted by K. V. Chernobrovkin lifted off to avoid hitting snow banks and was destroyed after hitting a hillside in zero visibility.

=== M-17 Stratosphera ===
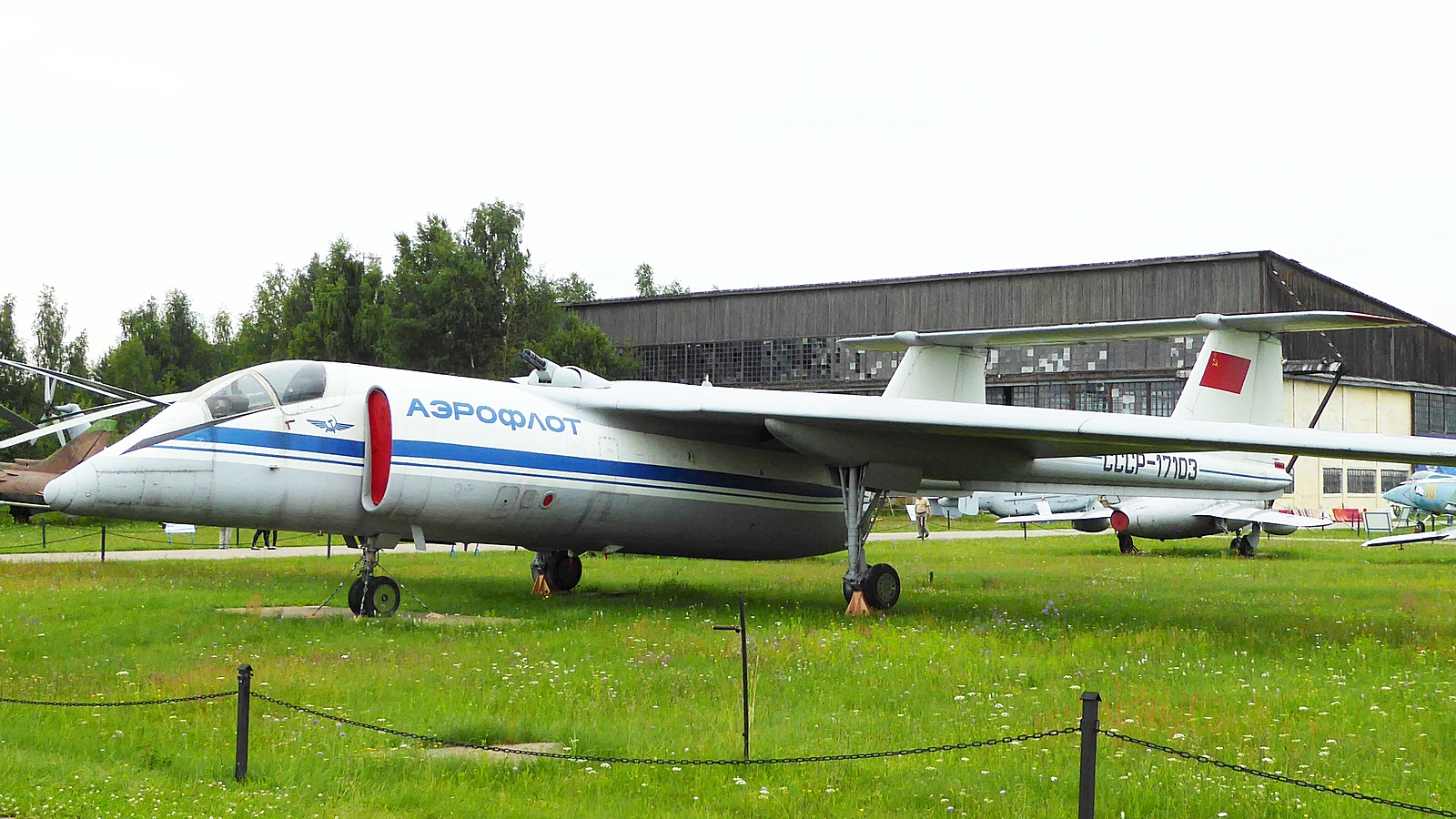
Myasishchev M-17 Stratosphera CCCP-17103 at Monino

The design of the Chaika was adapted as a reconnaissance aircraft and emerged as the Myasishchev M-17 Stratosphera with a revised airframe, including straight tapered wings with 2° 30' anhedral (0° at 1g), shorter fuselage pod and unreheated (non-afterburning) Kolesov RD-36-51 turbojet engine. Flown for the first time on 26 May 1982, the M-17 prototype (regn CCCP 17401) was soon allocated the NATO reporting name Mystic-A and was used for investigating the ozone layer over Antarctica in 1992.

The M-17 also set a total of 12 FAI world records, 5 of which still stand. On 28 March 1990, M-17 CCCP 17401 piloted by Vladimir V. Arkhipenko set an altitude record of 21,830 m (71,620 ft) in class C-1i (Landplanes: take-off weight 16 000 to 20 000 kg).

=== M-55 Geophysica ===
The M-17 balloon-interceptor-based model was terminated in 1987 and replaced by the M-17RN, later known as the M-55 Geophysica, NATO reporting name Mystic-B. First flown on 16 Aug 1988, the M-55 airframe was revised further with a longer fuselage pod, housing two Soloviev D-30-10V un-reheated turbofan engines, shorter-span wings and comprehensive sensor payload.

The M-55 set a total of 15 FAI world records, all of which still stand today: On 21 September 1993, an M-55 piloted by Victor Vasenkov from the 8th State R&D Institute of the Air Force named after V. P. Chkalov at Akhtubinsk reached a class record altitude of 21,360 m (70,080 ft) in class C-1j (Landplanes: take-off weight 20,000 to 25,000 kg (44,000 to 55,000 lb)).

A dual-control version, the M-55UTS, was developed by adding a second cockpit behind the original, displacing some avionics and/or sensor payload.

A number of M-55 Geophysica remained in service into the 1990s, performing in research roles; one M-55 took part in a study of the Arctic stratosphere in 1996–1997, with similar experiments performed in Antarctica during 1999.

An Irish-headquartered company Qucomhaps, with a focus on Southeast Asia, has entered a 1-billion USD deal to use the M-55 as a high-altitude platform station for digital communications.

== Service history ==
As of 2023, the UK Ministry of Defence believes that Russia is working to return the one flyable M-55 aircraft to military service for use in the Russian invasion of Ukraine.

== Variants ==
Subject 34
The prototype of a high-altitude balloon interceptor, dubbed Chaika (Gull), was completed in secret at the Kumertau helicopter plant in Bashkirya.
M-17 Stratosphera
A reconnaissance version of Subject 34, given the NATO reporting name Mystic-A, powered by a single Kolesov RD-36-51 turbojet engine. At least two M-17 aircraft were built.
M-17RN
Initial designation of what was to become the M-55.
M-55 Geophysica
A refined version of the M-17 powered by two Soloviev D-30-10V unreheated turbofans, carrying a wide variety of sensors for Earth-sciences research. Five M-55 aircraft were built, including one M-55UTS.
M-55Sh
Proposed ground attack variant. Not built.
M-55UTS
A dual-control trainer version of the M-55 with a second cockpit directly aft of the forward cockpit, displacing some of the avionic/sensor payload, otherwise identical to the M-55.
Geophysica 2
a more advanced Earth-sciences research aircraft derived from the M-55, which was not built.

== Operators ==
Soviet Union

- Soviet Air Force

Russia

- Russian Aerospace Forces

== Accidents and incidents ==
- December 1978 - Prototype Myasishchev M-17-1 Chayka high-altitude interceptor, painted in Aeroflot colours and bearing civil registration CCCP-17100, becomes accidentally airborne during initial taxi trial at Kumertau, when, in poor visibility, the starboard aileron accidentally lowered and aircraft turned abruptly. Pilot, Kir Chernobrovkin, takes off to avoid snow heap, but wingtip subsequently hits hillside and the prototype was destroyed, pilot KWF.

== Specifications (M-55) ==

Data from The Osprey Encyclopedia of Russian Aircraft 1875–1995

General characteristics

- Crew: 1 (M-55UTS: 2)
- Length: 22.867 m (75 ft 0 in)
- Wingspan: 37.46 m (122 ft 11 in)
- Height: 4.8 m (15 ft 9 in)
- Wing area: 131.6 m^{2} (1,417 sq ft)
- Aspect ratio: 10.6
- Empty weight: 13,995 kg (30,854 lb)
- Gross weight: 23,400 kg (51,588 lb)
- Max takeoff weight: 23,800 kg (52,470 lb)
- Fuel capacity: T-8V aviation jet fuel 7,900 kg (17,400 lb) initially, 8,300 kg (18,300 lb) later
- Powerplant: 2 × Soloviev D-30-V12 low-bypass turbofan, 93.192 kN (20,950 lbf) thrust each

Performance

- Never exceed speed: 332 km/h (206 mph, 179 kn) at 5,000 m (16,000 ft)

750 km/h (470 mph; 400 kn) at 20,000 m (66,000 ft)

- Range: 4,965 km (3,085 mi, 2,681 nmi)
- Endurance: 6.5 hours at 17,000 m (56,000 ft)
- Service ceiling: 21,500 m (70,500 ft)
- Maximum glide ratio: around 30:1 (engine off)
- Time to altitude: 21,000 m (69,000 ft) in 35 minutes
- Take-off distance: 900 m (3,000 ft)
- Landing distance: 780 m (2,560 ft)

== See also ==
Related development

- Space Adventures M-55X

Aircraft of comparable role, configuration, and era

- Martin RB-57D Canberra & Martin RB-57F Canberra
- Lockheed ER-2
- Beriev S-13
