= Eduard Yelyan =

Soviet test pilot

Eduard Elyan
- Native name: Эдуард Ваганович Елян
- Born: 20 August 1926; Baku
- Died: 6 April 2009 (aged 82) Rostov-on-Don
- Allegiance: Soviet Union
- Branch: Soviet Air Force
- Service years: 1944–1982
- Rank: Colonel
- Awards: Hero of the Soviet Union; Honoured Test Pilot of the USSR

Eduard Vaganovich Elyan (Russian: Эдуард Ваганович Елян; Armenian: Էդուարդ Վահանի Յոլյան; 20 August 1926 – 6 April 2009) was a test pilot who worked for major test flight centers including the Gromov Flight Research Institute and the Tupolev Design Bureau. He piloted many historic flights, including the maiden flight of the Tu-144. Throughout his career he piloted 90 types of aircraft and helicopters. For his work, he received many high honors including the titles Hero of the Soviet Union and Honoured Test Pilot of the USSR.

== Early life ==
Yelyan was born on 20 August 1926 to an Armenian family in Baku. During his youth, he lived in Norilsk, Moscow, and then Sverdlovsk, where he graduated from the Sverdlovsk Special Air Force School in 1944 before entering the military in June same year. He subsequently went on to attend additional training at the 9th Military Aviation School of Initial Pilot Training in Buguruslan and graduated later that year. Following this, he received further training at the Borisoglebsk Military Aviation School of Pilots, where he graduated in 1948. After graduating from the school, he worked there as an instructor pilot until 1951. In 1953, he attended the Test Pilot School in Zhukhovsky before starting his career as a test pilot.

== Test pilot career ==
Having started work at the Gromov Flight Research Institute in 1953, he flew test flights on a variety of aircraft and aircraft systems designed by various bureaus including Antonov, Ilyushin, Mikoyan, Sukhoi, Tupolev, and Yakovlev, as well as flight suits designed for high-altitude flights. On 12 August 1960 he started working at the Tupolev design bureau at the request of Andrey Tupolev.

At the Tupolev design bureau, he participated in tests on a variety of aircraft, including the Tupolev Tu-22, Tupolev Tu-124, Tupolev Tu-134, and Tupolev Tu-154. In 1967, he was awarded the title Honoured Test Pilot of the USSR for his work. On 31 December 1968, Yelyan served as pilot-in-command on the maiden flight of the Tupolev Tu-144, registered СССР-68001 with Mikhail Kozlov as co-pilot, this marked the first flight of a supersonic airliner. Before the maiden flight he and Kozlov practiced in a simulator; the test aircraft had ejection seats in the cockpit. The flight lasted 38 minutes, and he reported that the aircraft performed better than expected and said it was easy to fly. However, it was not until 5 June 1969 that a Tu-144 flight reached supersonic speed

Yelyan continued to fly the Tu-144, and in 1971, he was awarded the title Hero of the Soviet Union for his test pilot work. On 23 May 1978, he was forced to make an emergency belly landing of a Tu-144 test flight after a fuel line ruptured, resulting in a fire. Yelyan and five other crew members managed to escape the flames, but two flight engineers died. As a result of the crash Yelyan was seriously injured requiring hospitalization, and Tu-144 passenger flights were suspended, with the last Tu-144 passenger flight occurring nine days later. The subsequent inquiry found that the Tu-144 was too costly to justify continued operation. However, he continued to work as a test pilot until 1982, and he mastered flying 90 aircraft types during his career.

== Later life ==
After retiring from work as a test pilot in 1982, he worked as an engineer at the Mikoyan Design Bureau until 1996. He died on 6 April 2009 in Rostov-on-Don.

== Awards ==
- Hero of the Soviet Union (26 April 1971)
- Honoured Test Pilot of the USSR (20 September 1967)
- Order of Lenin (26 April 1971)
- Order of the Red Banner (21 August 1964)
- Order of the Red Star (31 July 1961)
- Paul Tissandier Diploma of the FAI (1969)

== Bibliography ==
- Sarkisyan, Arkady (1998). Армяне — военные ученые, конструкторы, производственники ис испытатели ХХ века (in Russian). Изд-во. «Гитутюн» НАН РА.
