= 1973 Paris Air Show Tupolev Tu-144 crash =

Aviation accident

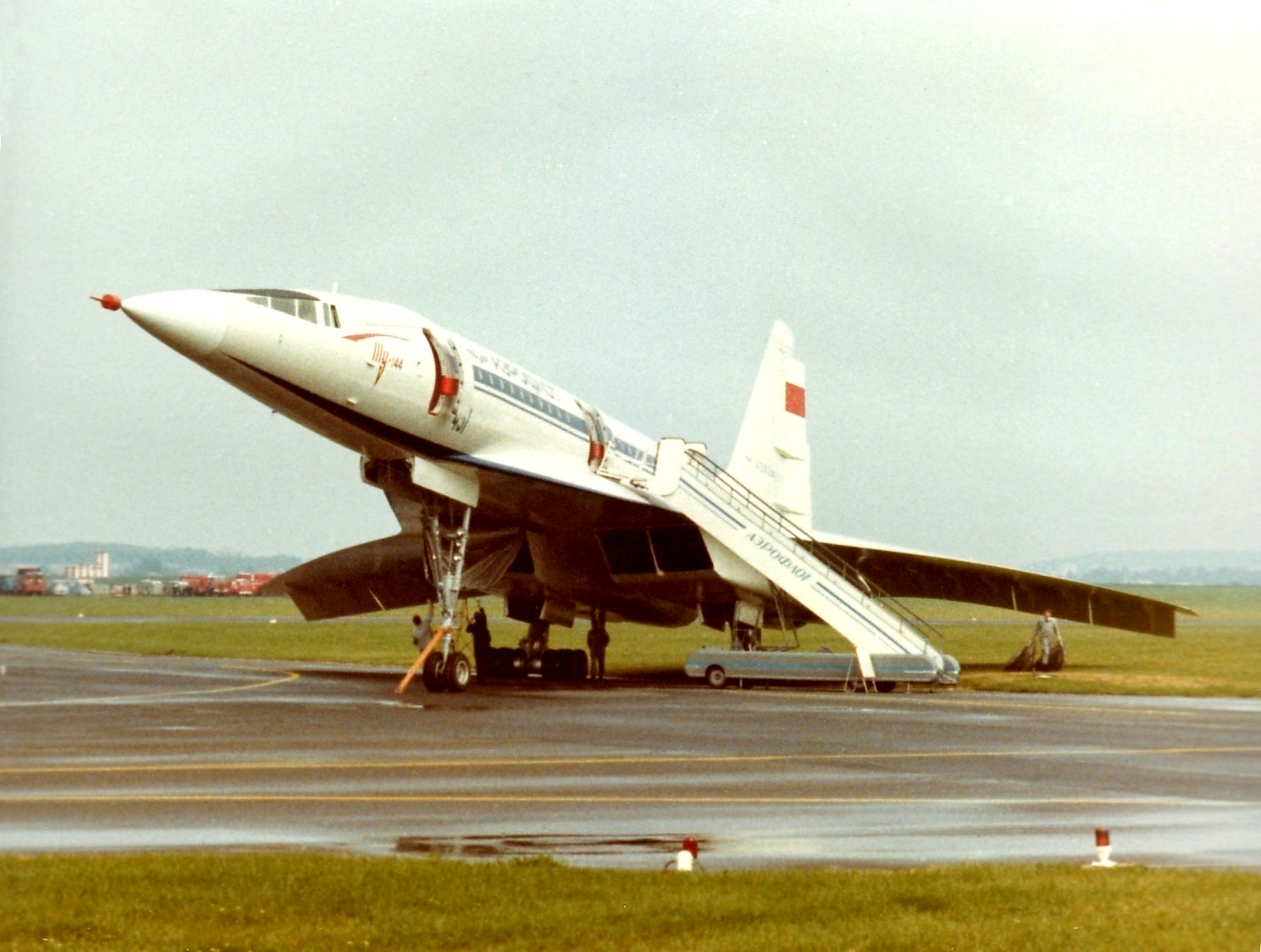
- СССР-77102, the Tupolev Tu-144 at the Paris Air Show, 2 June 1973, the day before the crash

Accident
- Date: 3 June 1973
- Summary: Crashed after in-flight structural failure
- Site: Goussainville, Val-d'Oise; 49°01′33″N 2°28′28″E
- Total fatalities: 14
- Total injuries: 60

Aircraft
- Aircraft type: Tupolev Tu-144S
- Operator: Aeroflot
- Registration: СССР-77102
- Flight origin: Paris–Le Bourget Airport
- Destination: Paris–Le Bourget Airport
- Occupants: 6
- Crew: 6
- Fatalities: 6
- Survivors: 0

Ground casualties
- Ground fatalities: 8
- Ground injuries: 60

On 3 June 1973, the second production model of the Soviet supersonic Tupolev Tu-144 airliner was destroyed in a crash during the 1973 Paris Air Show at Le Bourget Airport. Whilst performing a display that included extreme manoeuvres, the aircraft stalled at low altitude, and during the attempted recovery disintegrated in mid-air, falling on the town of Goussainville, Val-d'Oise, France, killing all six crew members and eight people on the ground. The crash ended the development program of the Tupolev Tu-144. The official inquest did not conclusively determine the cause of the accident, and several theories have been proposed.

== Accident ==
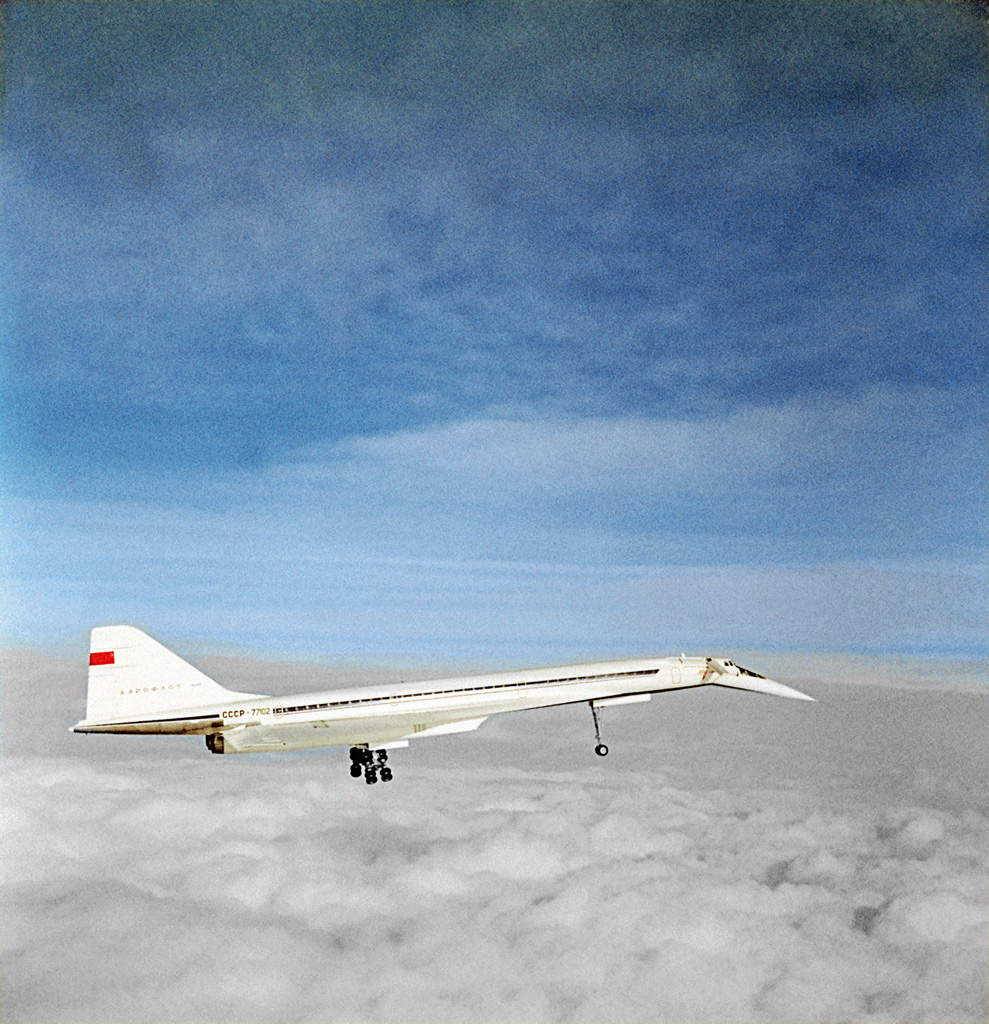
СССР-77102, the Tupolev Tu-144S involved in the accident, photographed on 18 May 1973, 2 weeks before the crash

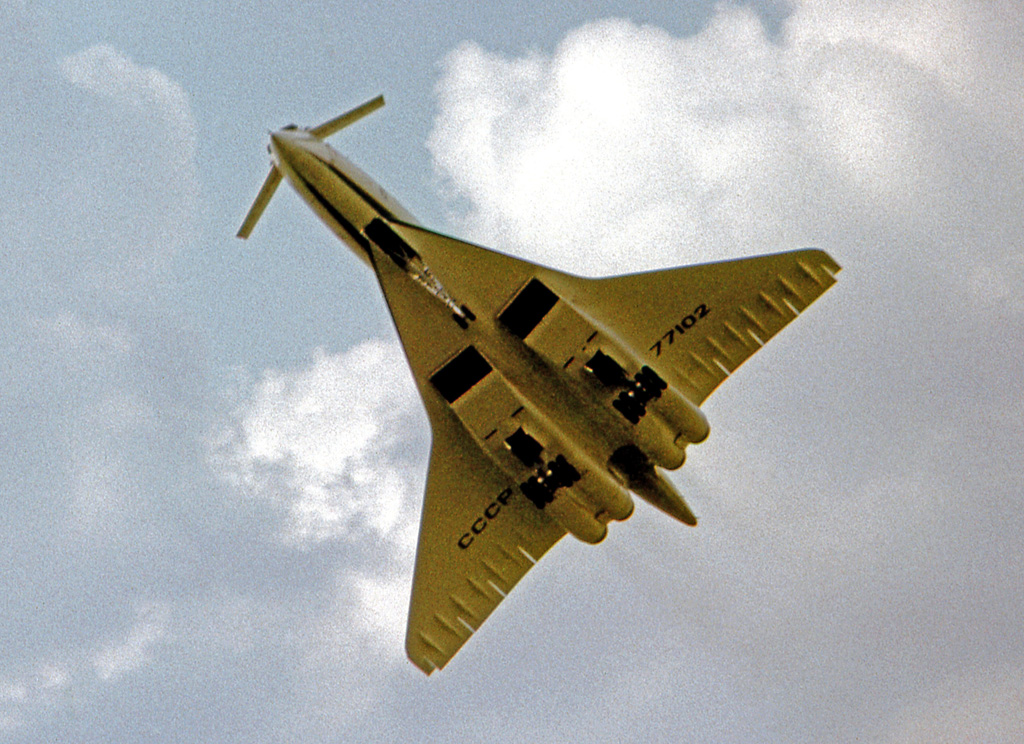
СССР-77102, the Tu-144S involved in the accident, seen at the 1973 Paris Air Show, the day before the accident

The aircraft involved was Tupolev Tu-144S СССР-77102, manufacturer's serial number 01–2, the second production Tu-144. It was first flown on 29 March 1972. This aircraft had been modified compared to the initial prototype to include landing gear that retracted into the nacelles and retractable canards. The pilot was Soviet test pilot Mikhail Vasilyevich Kozlov and the co-pilot was Valery M. Molchanov. Also on board were flight navigator G. N. Bazhenov; V. N. Benderov, deputy chief designer and engineer major-general; B. A. Pervukhin, senior engineer; and A. I. Dralin, flight engineer. The crash occurred in front of 250,000 spectators near the end of the Paris Air Show at Le Bourget airport, the world's largest air show and aerospace industry exhibition event.

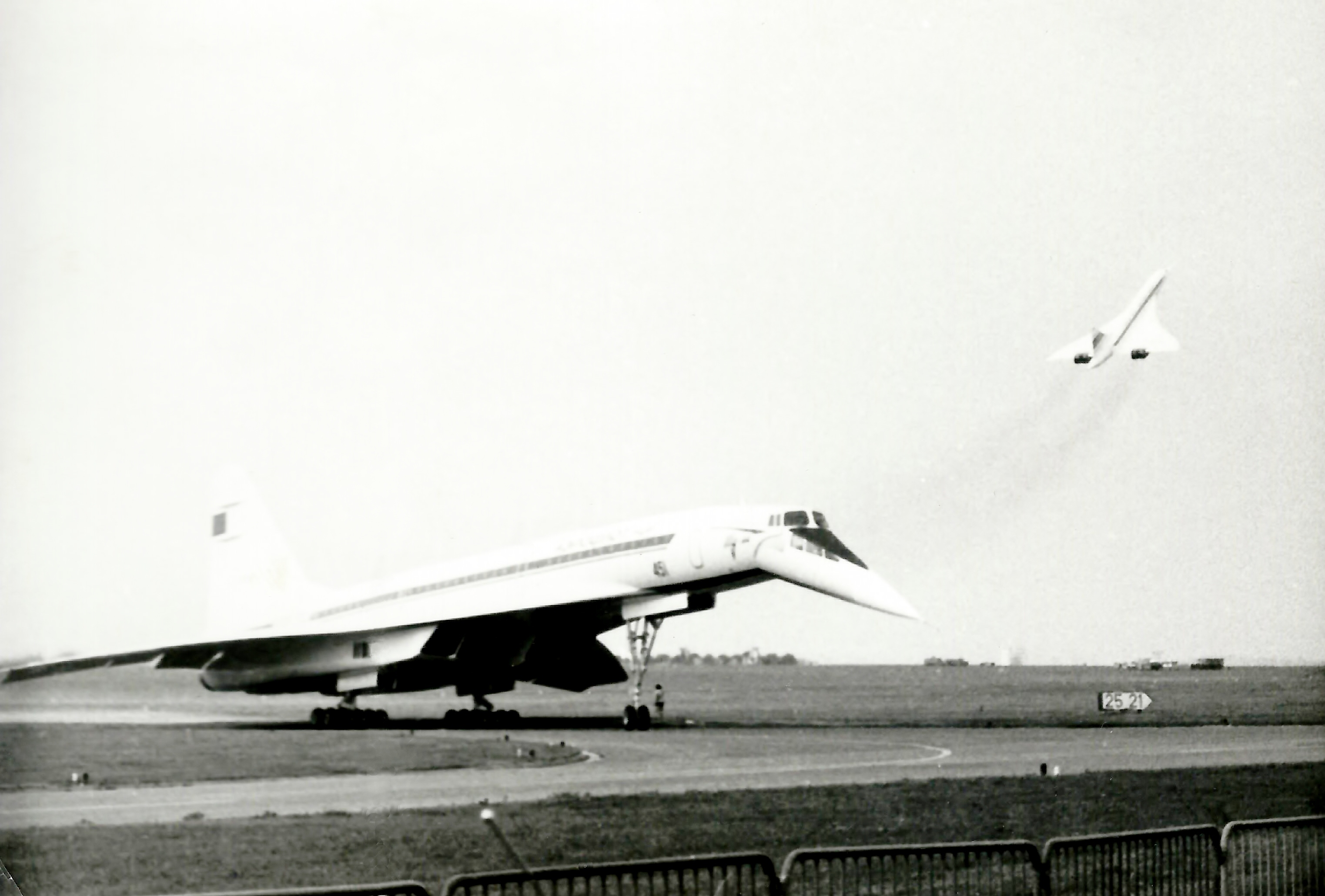
СССР-77102 on a taxiway at Le Bourget while Concorde takes off in the background, 2 June

During the show there had been "fierce competition between the Anglo-French Concorde and the Soviet Tu-144". The Soviet pilot, Mikhail Kozlov, had bragged that he would outperform the Concorde. "Just wait until you see us fly," he was quoted as saying. "Then you'll see something." On the final day of the show, the Concorde, which was not yet in production, performed its demonstration flight first. Its performance was later described as unexciting, and it has been suggested that Kozlov was determined to show how much better the Soviet aircraft was.

After several minutes in the air performing aerobatic manoeuvres in its second demonstration flight of the show, the Tu-144 flew a high-speed pass above the runway with the landing gear out and the "moustache" canards extended. Then, with all four engines at full power, it went into a steep and rapid climb. Below 2,000 ft (600 m) the aircraft stalled and fell into a steep dive. As the pilot tried to pull out of the dive at 400 feet (120 m) with the engines at full power, "the entire left wing outboard of the left-hand engines broke away. The aircraft snap-rolled left and inverted, overload stresses fractured the fuselage forward of the wing, and fuel vapour ignited." The aircraft crashed in flames on the town of Goussainville, eight kilometres north of Le Bourget, destroying 15 houses and killing all six people on board the Tu-144 and eight more on the ground. Three children were among those killed and 60 people received severe injuries.

== Aftermath ==
The crew of the Tu-144 were buried at the Novodevichy Cemetery in Moscow on 12 June 1973.

Following the crash, Marcel Dassault called for the 1975 Paris Air Show to be held at Istres, which is situated in open country 40 km (25 mi) northwest of Marseille.

The crash eroded enthusiasm surrounding the Tu-144, which was already in decline. Although not a major factor within the Soviet Union, environmental concerns about the supersonic transport (SST) concept were increasing in the West. Earlier in the year, government agencies in the US and UK had issued forecasts that SST per-seat operating costs would substantially exceed those of conventional airliners for the foreseeable future, and a UK government report said the Tu-144 would have even higher per-seat operating costs than Concorde. Historian Howard Moon speculated that these factors—together with continuing technical problems, an overextended Tupolev design bureau, high development costs coupled with a scarcity of alternative applications for Tu-144 technologies, and high fuel prices in the West stemming from the 1973 oil crisis a few months later—prompted Soviet leaders to deprioritize the aircraft's service entry with Aeroflot, as its value as a prestigious symbol of Soviet technical prowess had diminished.

By 1975, the Soviet aviation industry had pivoted to promoting new conventional subsonic airliners, the Yakovlev Yak-42 and Ilyushin Il-86. Restrictions on the Tu-144 following the Paris Air Show crash meant that it only saw limited service during 1977 and 1978, and it was finally withdrawn following another crash in May 1978. The Tu-144's rival, Concorde, went on to serve with British Airways and Air France for another 30 years and was finally withdrawn from service in 2003 because of low passenger numbers, following the crash of Flight 4590 (coincidentally also within the vicinity of Le Bourget), rising service costs and the slump in the aviation industry following the September 11 attacks.

=== Investigation ===
The accident was investigated by the DTICA (Direction Technique et Industrielle des Constructions Aéronautiques), part of the French military, which was responsible for accidents involving prototype aircraft in France. The wreckage was recovered to a hangar at Le Bourget, with some of it being flown by an Antonov An-22 to the Soviet Union. Moon wrote that the investigation was clouded by political considerations from the outset. The Soviets were distrustful of the French proposal to reconstruct the wreckage in the hangar, being unfamiliar with the technique, and the French had been actively seeking Concorde overflight rights in the Soviet Union. An exoneration of the Tu-144 from a technical and design standpoint was in the political interests of both countries. Throughout the investigation, the Soviets strenuously objected behind the scenes against French attempts to issue firm conclusions. The official report from the French investigative commission, produced in collaboration with Soviet experts, proposed a hypothesis involving a French jet plane in proximity and an unsecured Tu-144 crew member with a film camera, which might have inadvertently blocked the controls during an evasion manoeuvre. But with no concrete evidence supporting this theory, the commission concluded that the exact cause of the disaster remained undetermined. At the same time, the report specifically stated that there was "no abnormality in either the airliner's design or the general functioning of the aircraft and its systems", and it ruled out inadequate structural design as a cause. While the investigation's outcome was largely suitable for both sides, it gave rise to a number of alternative theories.

=== Theories ===
Flight profile of Tu-144 and Mirage IIIR

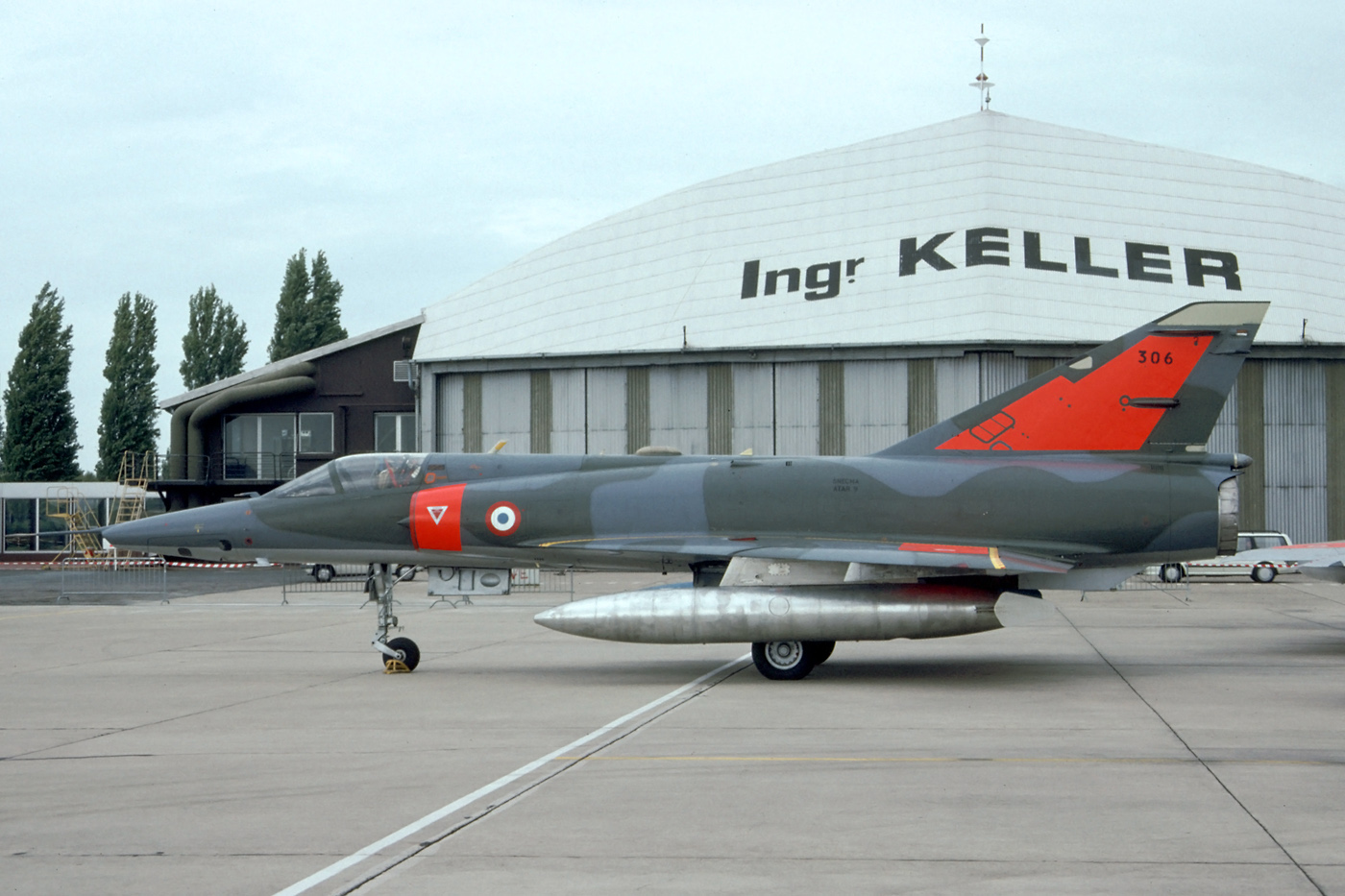
A French Dassault Mirage IIIR fighter jet. Shortly before the accident, a Mirage IIIR had taken off from the airport. A theory for the incident suggests that the Tu-144 swerved to avoid the Mirage and lost control, breaking up before striking the ground.

One theory is that the Tu-144 manoeuvred to avoid a French Mirage chase plane that was attempting to photograph its unique canards, which were advanced for the time. It is suggested that the French and Soviet governments colluded to cover up the break-up of the plane during a pull-up manoeuvre. The alleged actions of the Mirage were denied in the original French report of the incident. More recent reports have admitted the existence of the Mirage and the fact that the Soviet crew were not told about the Mirage's flight, although not the Mirage's supposed role in the crash. The official press release stated that "although the inquiry established that there was no real risk of collision between the two aircraft, the Soviet pilot was likely to have been surprised".

Moon stressed that last-minute changes to the flight schedule, combined with "sloppy" air traffic control, would have disoriented the Tu144's pilots in a cockpit with notably poor sightlines. Moon noted that the flight crew had prepared a choreographed flight demonstration routine that had been practised at least six times before leaving the Soviet Union, which had to be discarded because of the scheduling changes. He also cited an eyewitness who claimed that the co-pilot had agreed to take a camera with him, which he may have been operating at the time of the evasive manoeuvre. It was suggested that the initial approach may have been an attempted landing on the wrong runway because of last-minute shortening of the Tu-144's display.

An important contributing factor could have been that control surfaces deflection had been de-restricted before the flight, perhaps to allow for a more impressive demonstration. A bug in the electronic flight controls could have deflected the elevons 10 degrees down after the retraction of the canards, causing a sudden dive.

On 24 October 1973, the London Daily Telegraph published a report stating that a wrench (spanner) had fallen into the recess around the control stick, jamming the aircraft flight control system.

A self-styled fringe group calling itself "Liberation of Rudolf Hess" claimed to have blown up the Tu-144 in protest of Hess's continued imprisonment at Spandau Prison. Hess's son rejected this claim, saying that he had never heard of the group.

Bob Hoover, for many years an airshow display pilot, believed that the rivalry of the Tu-144 and Concorde had led the pilot of the Tu-144 to attempt a manoeuvre that went beyond the abilities of the aircraft: "That day, the Concorde went first, and after the pilot performed a high-speed flyby, he pulled up steeply and climbed to approximately 10,000 feet (3,000 m) before levelling off. When the Tu-144 pilot performed the same manoeuvre he pulled the nose up so steeply I didn't believe he could possibly recover."
