= Mikhail Vasilyevich Kozlov =

Soviet test pilot

Mikhail Kozlov
- Native name: Михаил Васильевич Козлов
- Born: 5 November 1928; Yezhovo village, Kostroma Governorate, RSFSR, USSR
- Died: 3 June 1973 (aged 44) Goussainville, Val-d'Oise, France
- Allegiance: Soviet Union
- Branch: Soviet Air Force
- Service years: 1946–1973
- Rank: Colonel
- Awards: Hero of the Soviet Union; Honoured Test Pilot of the USSR

Mikhail Vasilyevich Kozlov (Russian: Михаил Васильевич Козлов; 5 November 1928 – 3 June 1973) was a Soviet test pilot who received the title Hero of the Soviet Union and Honoured Test Pilot of the USSR for his work. As the co-pilot on the maiden flight of the Tu-144, he was one of very few pilots to fly the Tupolev Tu-144 supersonic airliner, and was given the honor of flying it at the 1973 Paris Airshow. He died when the Tu-144 crashed during its display. The cause of the crash remains disputed.

== Early life ==
Kozlov was born on 5 November 1928 to a Russian family in Yezhevo village. He entered the military in 1946 and the following year graduated from the Tambov Military Aviation School of Pilots. After graduating from the Kirovabad Military Aviation School of Pilots in 1951, he worked as a flight instructor and in 1953 became a member of the Communist Party. In 1955 he entered test pilot school, graduating in 1957.

== Test pilot work ==
After graduating from test pilot school, Kozlov began working for the Tupolev Design Bureau. He tested a variety of aircraft, including flying as the pilot-in-command on the maiden flight of the Tu-128 in 1961; he also flew a variety of tests on the Tupolev Tu-16, Tupolev Tu-22, Tupolev Tu-22M, Tupolev Tu-95, Tupolev Tu-104, Tupolev Tu-110, Tupolev Tu-110B, Tupolev Tu-114, Tupolev Tu-124, Tupolev Tu-134, and Tupolev Tu-154. He is most known for his role in the testing of the Tu-144 supersonic airliner, serving as co-pilot for Eduard Yelyan on its maiden flight on 31 December 1968. He had graduated from the Moscow Aviation Institute in 1966 and spent a lot of time in the Tu-144 simulator before flying the aircraft. For his work as a test pilot he received several high honors, including the title Hero of the Soviet Union on 22 July 1966 and Honoured Test Pilot of the USSR on 22 August 1972.

== Death ==
Kozlov was chosen to pilot the Tu-144 registered СССР-77102 at the Paris Airshow in 1973. The flight plan for the Tu-144 had been modified at the last minute, leaving the crew less time to complete their demonstration. On 3 June, the last day of the airshow, the Tu-144 flew after Concorde's demonstration flight. During the Tu-144 demonstration, Kozlov flew the plane low along Runway 060. For reasons that remain disputed, the plane suddenly maneuvered violently, first nose up towards a stall followed by a dive, resulting in a mid-air breakup of the aircraft, the remnants of which crashed on the French village of Goussainville, Val-d'Oise, killing all on board the plane and several people on the ground. On 12 June 1973 Kozlov was buried in the Novodevichy Cemetery with the rest of the crew.

The exact cause of the crash remains disputed. Initial theories considered pilot error by the Tu-144 crew and suggested that they may have tried to demonstrate manoeuvres beyond the aircraft's capabilities in rivalry with Concorde. The possibility of improper configuration of the aircraft's systems by the ground crew was also considered. Later investigation led to the revelation that a French Mirage fighter had been flying close to the designated flight path of the Tu-144. The French government initially denied this, but eventually acknowledged that an aircraft had been present to photograph the TU-144's unique canards. The crew of Tu-144 were not informed that there would be another plane flying close to them, and it is suggested that they could have been startled into making drastic evasive manoeuvres.

== Awards ==
- Hero of the Soviet Union (22 July 1966)
- Order of Lenin (22 July 1966)
- Honoured Test Pilot of the USSR (22 August 1972)
- Order of the October Revolution (26 April 1971)
- Two Order of the Red Star (31 July 1961 and 21 August 1984)
- jubilee medals
