= Tupolev Tu-144 =

Soviet supersonic passenger airliner

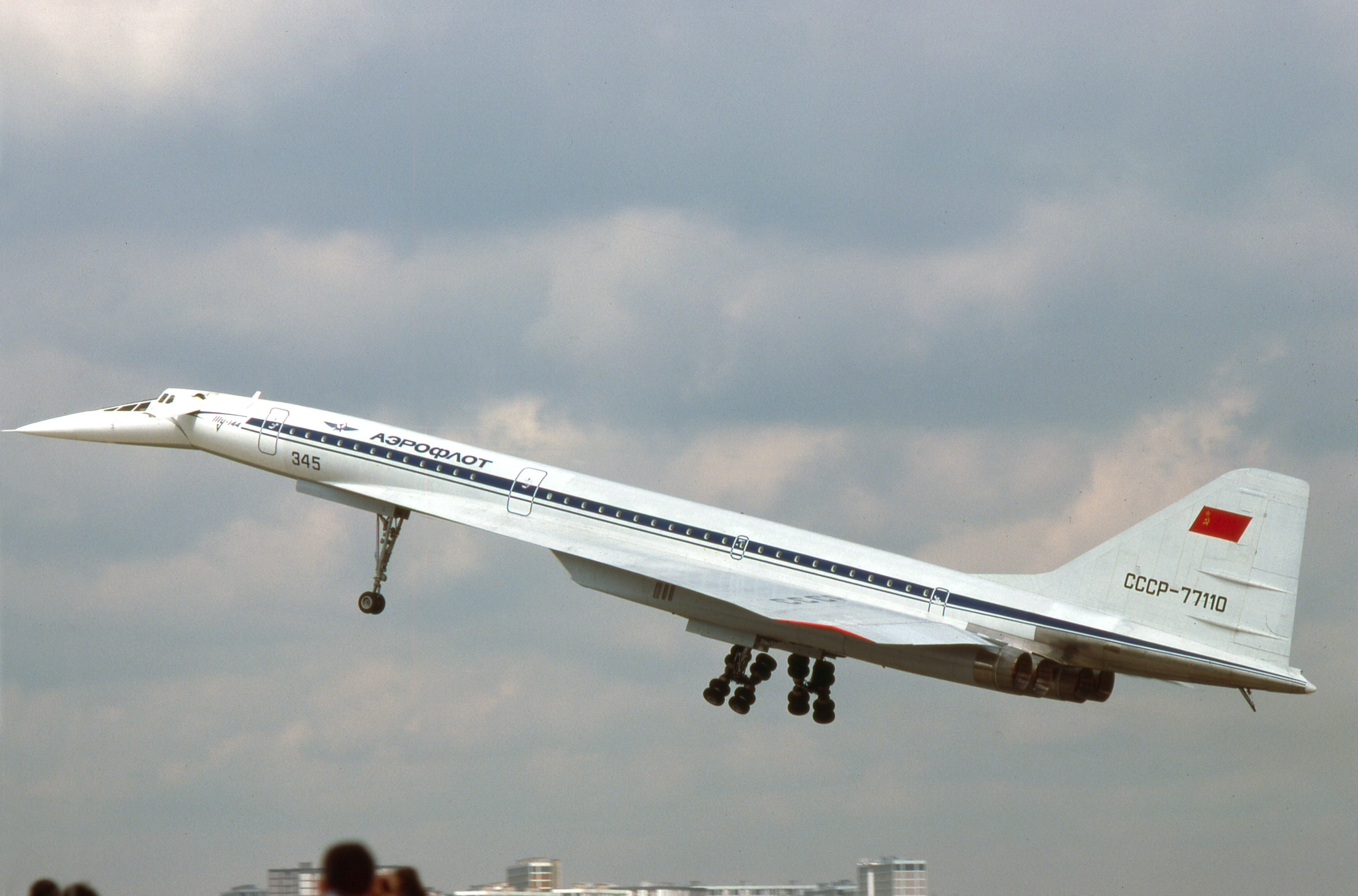
- An Aeroflot Tupolev Tu-144 taking off

General information
- Type: Supersonic airliner
- National origin: Soviet Union
- Manufacturer: Voronezh Aircraft Production Association
- Designer: Tupolev OKB
- Status: Retired
- Primary users: Aeroflot Ministry of Aviation Industry; NASA
- Number built: 16 (1 unfinished)

History
- Manufactured: 1967–1983
- Introduction date: 26 December 1975
- First flight: 31 December 1968
- Retired: Retired from passenger service (1978); Retired from commercial service (1983); Retired (1999)
- Variants: Tu-144LL; Tupolev Tu-244
- Fate: 7 preserved in museums 8 scrapped and 2 destroyed

The Tupolev Tu-144 (Russian: Tyполев Ту-144; NATO reporting name: Charger; Nickname: "Concordski") is a Soviet supersonic passenger airliner designed by Tupolev that operated commercially from 1975 to 1983, including 1977–1978 passenger service.

The Tu-144 was the world's first commercial supersonic transport aircraft with its prototype's maiden flight from Zhukovsky Airport on 31 December 1968, two months before the British-French Concorde. The Tu-144 was a product of the Tupolev Design Bureau, an OKB headed by aeronautics pioneer Aleksey Tupolev, and 16 aircraft were manufactured by the Voronezh Aircraft Production Association in Voronezh. The Tu-144 conducted 102 commercial flights, of which only 55 carried passengers, at an average service altitude of 16,000 metres (52,000 ft) and cruised at a speed of around 2,200 kilometres per hour (1,400 mph) (Mach 2). The Tu-144 first went supersonic on 5 June 1969, four months before Concorde, and on 26 May 1970 became the world's first commercial transport to exceed Mach 2.

Reliability and developmental issues restricted the viability of the Tu-144 for regular use; these factors, together with repercussions of the 1973 Paris Air Show Tu-144 crash, projections of high operating costs, and rising fuel prices and environmental concerns outside the Soviet Union, caused foreign customer interest to wane. The Tu-144 was introduced into commercial service with Aeroflot between Moscow and Alma-Ata on 26 December 1975 and starting 1 November 1977 passenger flights began; it was withdrawn less than seven months later after a new Tu-144 variant crash-landed during a test flight on 23 May 1978. The Tu-144 remained in commercial service as a cargo aircraft until the cancellation of the Tu-144 programme in 1983. The Tu-144 was later used by the Soviet space programme to train pilots of the Buran spacecraft, and by NASA for a supersonic research programme from June 1996 to April 1999. The Tu-144 made its final flight on 26 June 1999 and surviving aircraft were put on display in Russia, the former Soviet Union and Germany, or into storage.

== Background ==
Given the vast size of the Soviet Union, supersonic travel was seen as economically feasible, especially for government employees travelling between Moscow and Siberian cities. Flying was the only practical alternative to week-long rail journeys, and supersonic transport could significantly cut travel times. While the idea of SSTs was controversial in the West due to noise and environmental pollution concerns, the Soviet Union planned to continue with their development, largely for its long Siberian and Central Asian routes. With ample airspace, flight corridors were likely to avoid built-up areas. Even if international landing rights were not granted, the Tu-144 could still be used for domestic and regional flights.

Aeroflot, the flag carrier of the Soviet Union, had an extensive network of interconnected airfields and increasing international reach, with hopes of extending flights to Sydney, Australia. Initial estimates suggested that 20 Tu-144s would suffice for Aeroflot's domestic and international needs.

Given the geopolitical climate during the Cold War period, the Soviet Union was intent on not just matching, but surpassing Western advancements, particularly in aerospace technology. The idea of the West getting ahead and leaving the Soviet Union behind was unthinkable. The directive from Nikita Khrushchev, the leader of the Soviet Union at that time, was clear: not only prevent the West from getting ahead, but also compete fiercely, even to the extent of leapfrogging their technological advancements, if necessary. The aircraft was seen as a formidable challenge to the United States' dominance in the field of civil aviation.

== Development ==
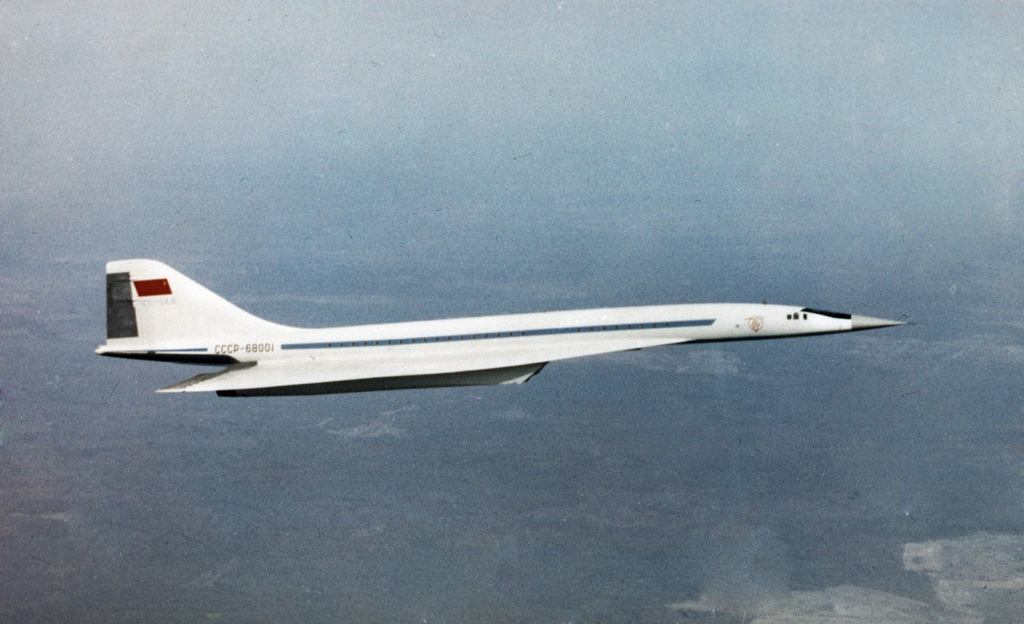
Tu-144 prototype in flight on 1 February 1969

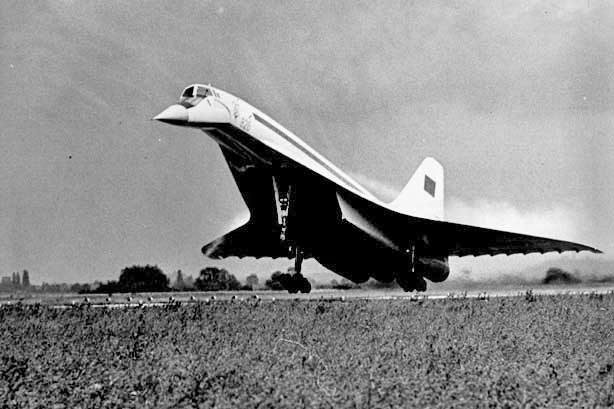
Tu-144 prototype in June 1971, Berlin Schönefeld Airport

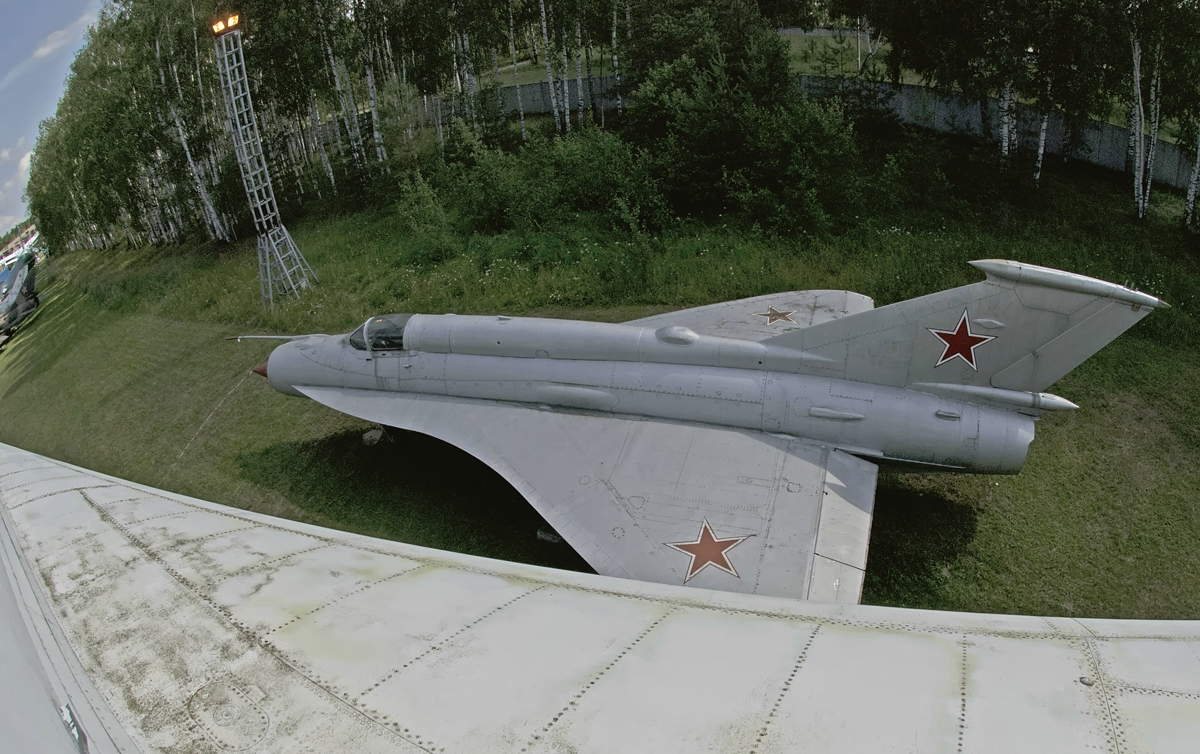
MiG-21I Analog, used as a testbed for the Tu-144's wing

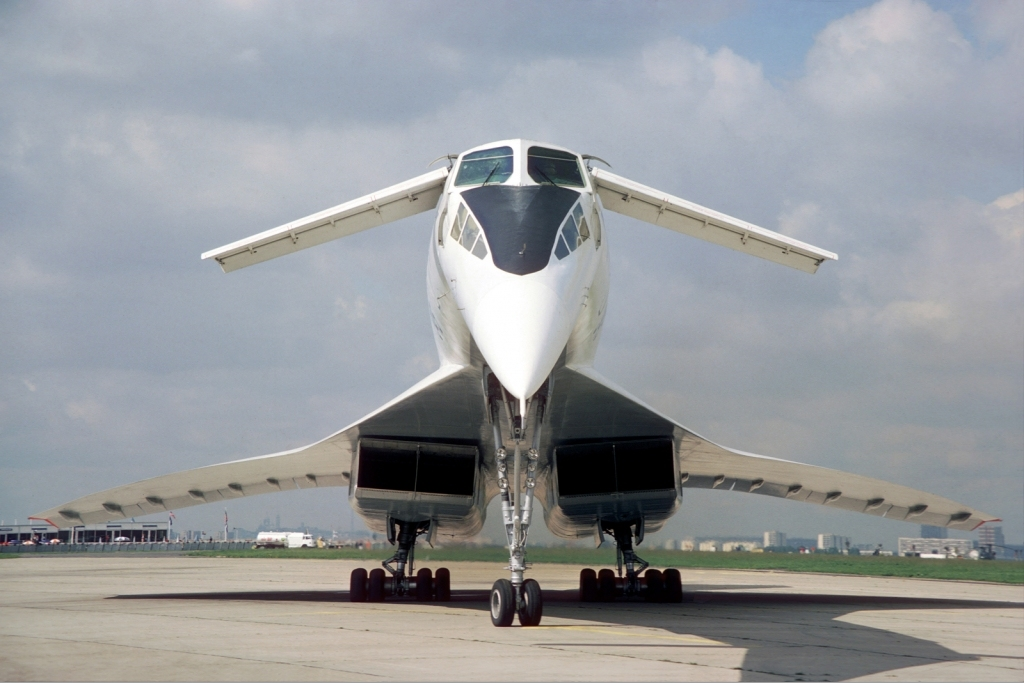
View of the front of the Tu-144, with the distinctive retractable moustache canards deployed and drooped nose

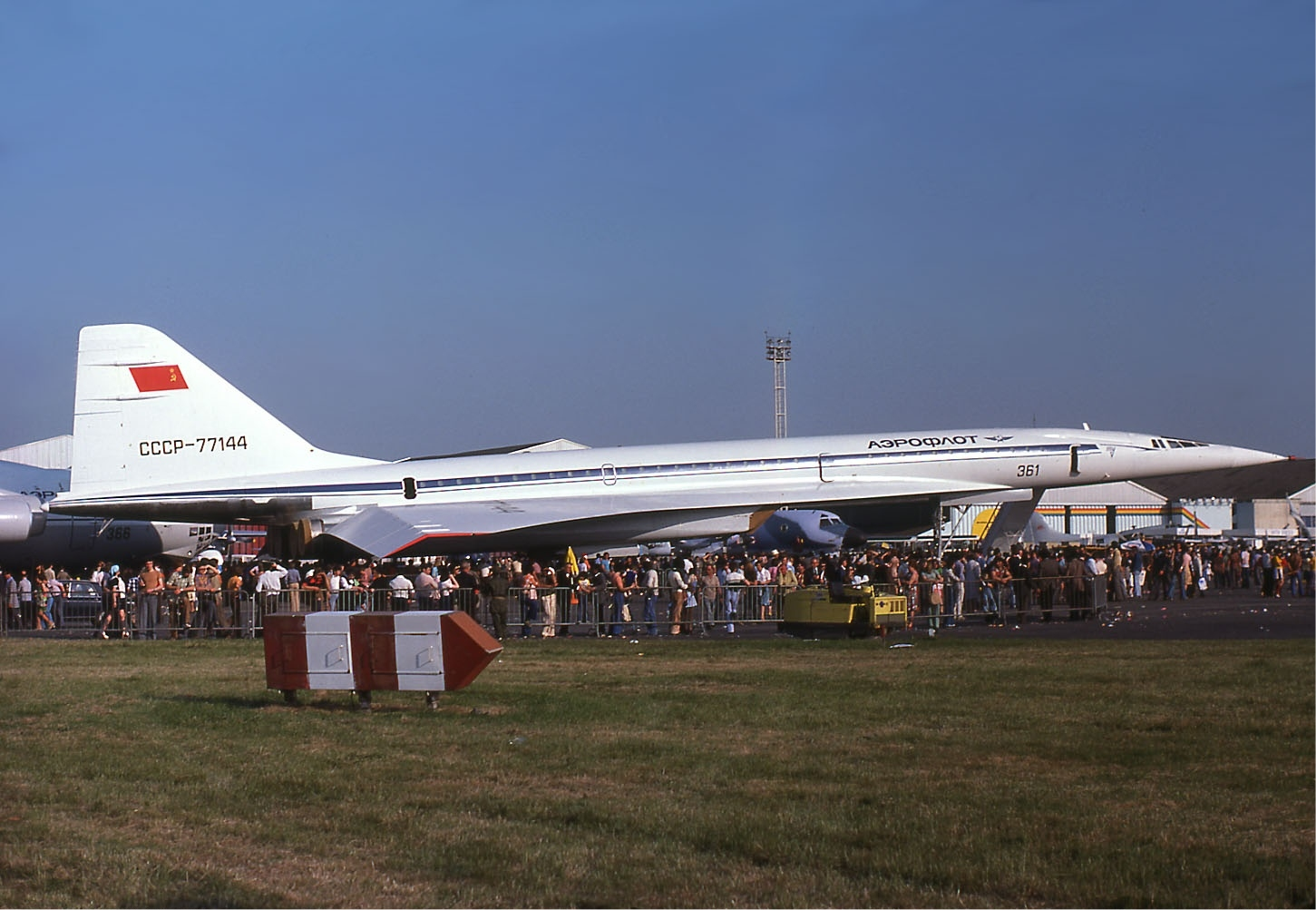
Aeroflot Tu-144 at the Paris Air Show in 1975.

The Soviet government published the concept of the Tu-144 in an article in the January 1962 issue of the magazine Technology of Air Transport. The air ministry started development of the Tu-144 on 26 July 1963, 10 days after the design was approved by the Council of Ministers. The plan called for five flying prototypes to be built in four years, with the first aircraft to be ready in 1966.

Despite the similarity in appearance of the Tu-144 to the Anglo-French supersonic aircraft (which earned it the nickname "Concordski"), there were significant differences between the two aircraft. The Tu-144 is bigger and faster than the Concorde (M2.15 vs. M2.04). Concorde used an electronic engine control package from Lucas, which Tupolev was not permitted to purchase for the Tu-144 as it could also be used on military aircraft. Concorde's designers used fuel as coolant for the cabin air conditioning and for the hydraulic system (see Concorde for details). Tupolev also used fuel/hydraulic heat exchangers, but used cooling turbines for the cabin air.

The Tu-144 prototype was a full-scale demonstrator aircraft with the very different production aircraft being developed in parallel. The MiG-21I (1968; Izdeliye 21–11; "Analog") I = Imitator ("Simulator") was a testbed for the wing design of the Tu-144 but came too late to provide inputs for the first prototype. The findings of the MiG-21I led to the completely redesigned wing of the following aircraft. While both Concorde and the Tu-144 prototype had ogival delta wings, the Tu-144's wing lacked Concorde's conical camber. Production Tu-144s replaced this wing with a double delta wing including spanwise and chordwise camber.

They also added two small retractable surfaces called a moustache canard, with fixed double-slotted leading-edge slats and retractable double-slotted flaps. These were fitted just behind the cockpit and increased lift at low speeds.

Moving the elevons downward in a delta-wing aircraft increases the lift, but also pitches its nose downward. The canards cancel out this nose-downwards moment, thus reducing the landing speed of the production Tu-144s to 315–333 km/h (196–207 mph; 170–180 kn).

== Design ==
Along with early Tu-134s, the Tu-144 was one of the last commercial aircraft with a braking parachute. The Tu-144 was not fitted with any reverse thrust capabilities, and so the parachute was used as the sole alternative. A prototype without passenger seats was fitted with ejection seats for pilots. The interior was designed by painter Yury Kataev.

Materials

The aircraft was designed for a 30,000-hour service life over 15 years. Airframe heating and the high temperature properties of the primary structural materials, which were aluminium alloys, set the maximum speed at Mach 2.2. 15% by weight was titanium and 23% non-metallic materials. Titanium or stainless steel were used for the leading edges, elevons, rudder and the rear fuselage engine-exhaust heat shield.

=== Engines ===
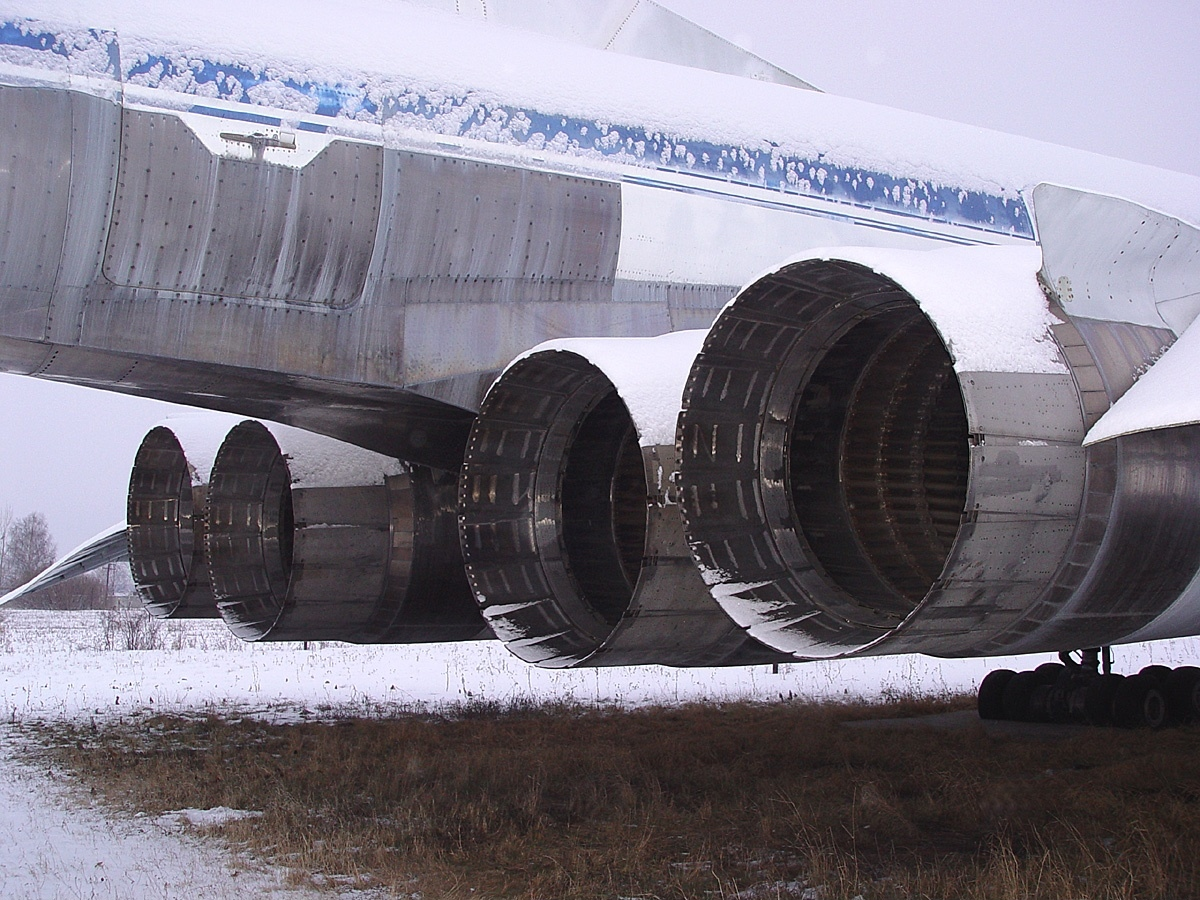
Afterburning nozzles on the Kuznetsov turbofan.

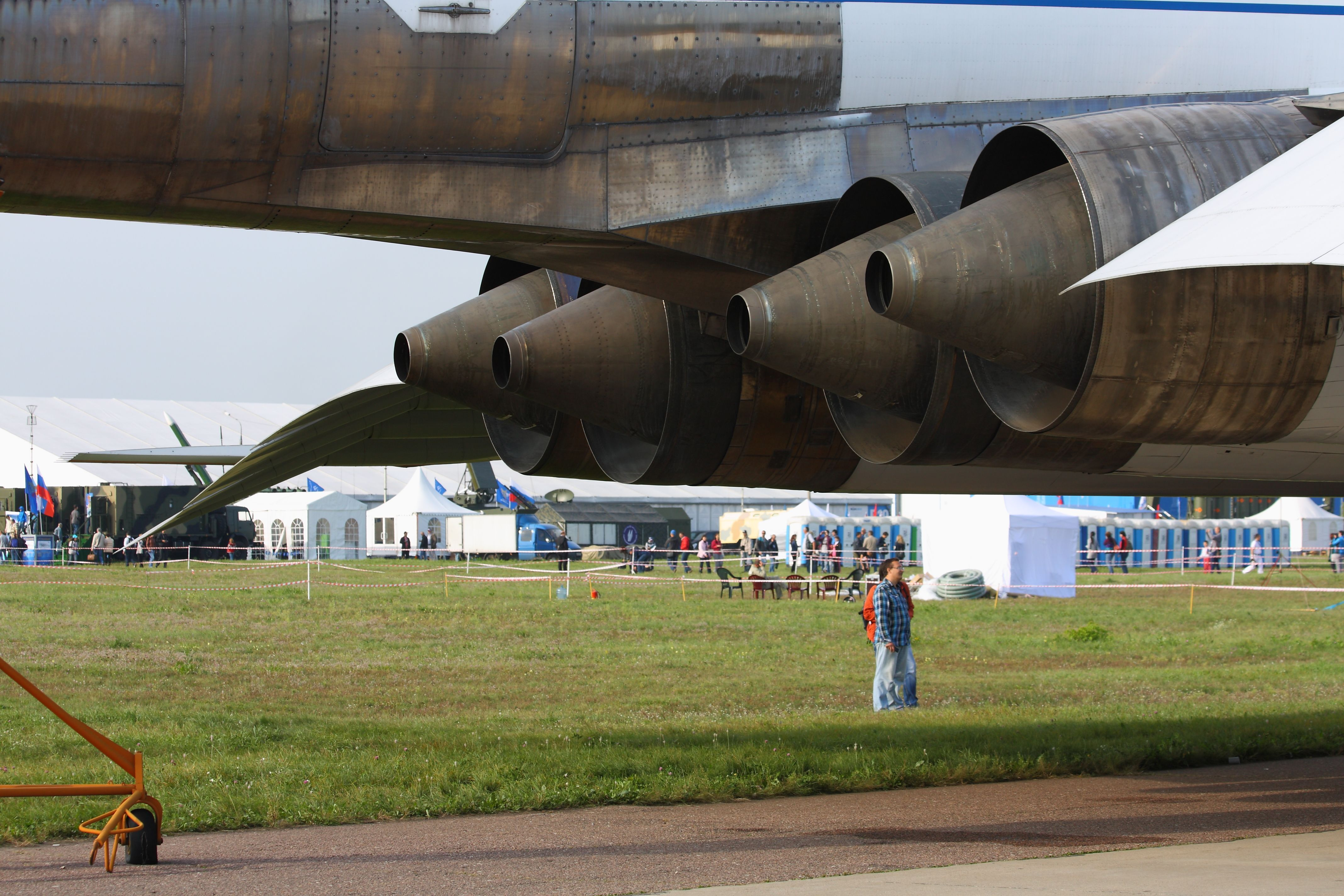
Plug nozzles on the non-afterburning Kolesov turbojet.

SSTs for M2.2 had been designed in the Soviet Union before Tupolev was tasked with developing one. Design studies for the Myasishchev SST had shown that a cruise specific fuel consumption (SFC) of not more than 1.2 kg/kgp hr would be required. The only engine available in time with the required thrust and suitable for testing and perfecting the aircraft was the afterburning Kuznetsov NK-144 turbofan with a cruise SFC of 1.58 kg/kgp hr. Development of an alternative engine to meet the SFC requirement, a non-afterburning turbojet, the Kolesov RD-36-51A, began in 1964. It took a long time for this engine to achieve acceptable SFC and reliability. In the meantime the NK-144 high SFC gave a limited range of about 2,500 km (1,600 mi; 1,300 nmi), far less than Concorde. A maximum speed of 2,443 km/h (1,518 mph; 1,319 kn) (Mach 2.35) was reached with afterburning. Afterburners were added to Concorde to meet its take-off thrust requirement and were not necessary for supersonic cruise; the Tu-144 used maximum afterburner for take-off and minimum for cruise.

The Tu-144S, of which nine were produced, was fitted with the Kuznetsov NK-144A turbofan to address lack of take-off thrust and surge margin. SFC at M2.0 was 1.81 kg/kgp hr. A further improvement, the NK-144V, achieved the required SFC, but too late to influence the decision to use the Kolesov RD-36-51.

The Tu-144D, of which five were produced (plus one uncompleted), was powered by the Kolesov RD-36-51 turbojet with an SFC of 1.22 kg/kgp hr. The range with full payload increased to 5,330 km compared to 6,470 km for Concorde. Plans for an aircraft with a range in excess of 7,000 km (4,300 mi; 3,800 nmi) range were never implemented.

The engine intakes had variable intake ramps and bypass flaps with positions controlled automatically to suit the engine airflow. They were very long to help prevent surging; twice as long as those on Concorde. Jean Rech (Sud Aviation) states the need for excessive length was based on the misconception that length was required to attenuate intake distortion. The intakes were to be shortened by 10 feet on the projected Tu-144M.

The Kolesov RD-36-51 had an unusual translating plug nozzle as an alternative to a variable con-di nozzle, either of which give the variable area ratio required for the range of nozzle pressures which come from low inlet ram at low speeds to high at Mach 2. A plug nozzle was studied for Concorde but rejected as it was not certain that it could be cooled adequately during afterburner operation. The RD-36-51 had no afterburner.

=== Airframe ===
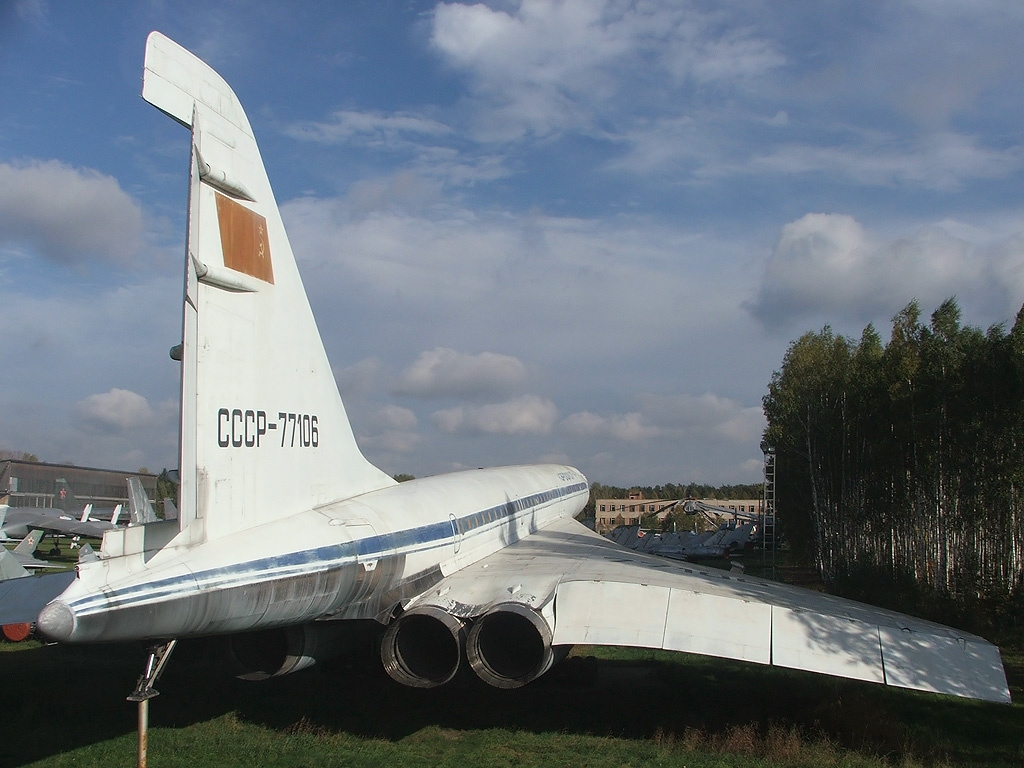
Tail surfaces or empennage showing deflected rudder and no horizontal tailplane.

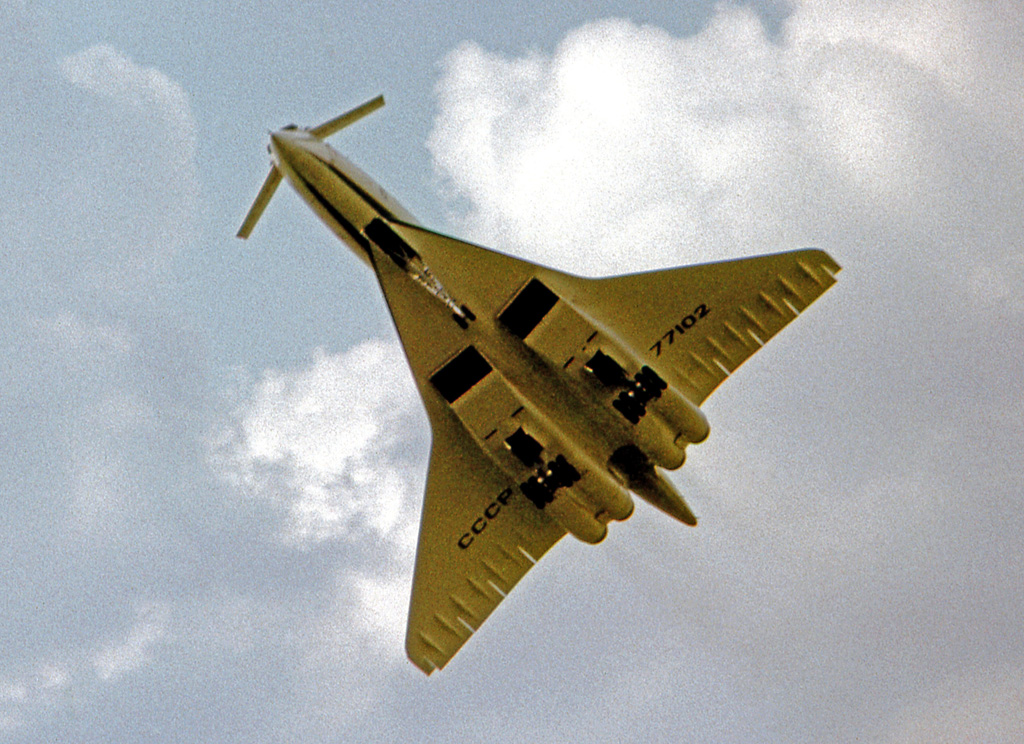
The first production Tu-144S displaying at the 1973 Paris Air Show on the day before it crashed. The aircraft's planform and canards are clearly shown.

The aircraft was assembled from parts machined from large slabs, many over 19 m (62 ft) long and 0.64 to 1.27 m (2.1 to 4.2 ft) wide. While at the time, this approach was heralded as an advanced feature of the design, it turned out that finished parts contained defects which had not been detected in the raw material. Cracks formed at the defects at load levels below that which the part was expected to withstand. Once a crack started to grow, it spread quickly over many metres, with no crack-arresting design feature to stop it. In 1976, during repeat-load and static testing at TsAGI (Russia's Central Aerohydrodynamic Institute), a Tu-144S airframe cracked at 70% of the design flight load with cracks running many metres in both directions from their origin.

Two Tu-144S airframes suffered structural failures during laboratory testing just prior to the Tu-144 entering passenger service. The problem, discovered in 1976, may have been known prior to this testing; a large crack was discovered in the airframe of the prototype Tu-144 (aircraft 68001) during a stopover in Warsaw following its appearance at the 1971 Paris Air Show. Polish sources say the crack was discovered after the aircraft made an emergency landing due to the failure of both left-hand engines; however, an Aeroflot spokesperson denied the damage and disputed the circumstances of the landing.

Later the same year, a test airframe was subjected to a test simulating the temperatures and pressures occurring during a flight. High skin temperatures of 110–130 °C (230–270 °F) were caused by kinetic heating when the boundary layer air reached 150–180 °C (300–360 °F) during cruise. The Tu-144 was placed in an environmental chamber and heated to simulate the skin getting hot quickly, during acceleration to cruising speed, while the underlying structure took a while to reach its equilibrium temperature. This thermal effect caused internal stresses and the situation was reversed while slowing down and descending. The pressure in the cabin, which caused additional stresses, was changed at the same time as the skin heating to simulate climbing to cruise altitude and then descending. Repeatedly cycling the temperature and pressure, as happened with the aircraft in service, caused fatigue damage and the airframe failed in a similar way to that of the TsAGI load testing.

According to Iosif Fridlyander, an aerospace aluminium and beryllium alloys expert, the Tu-144 design allowed a higher incidence of defects in the alloy structure, leading to the fatal in-air breakup of the aircraft in the 1973 Paris Air Show Tu-144 crash. This conclusion was supported by some of the designers involved in the aircraft's development. Vadim Razumikhin wrote that the load factor experienced by the plane at the moment of the break-up was less than the design limit. If the stress tests had been conducted earlier, the disaster may have been averted. Eventually, the airframe was strengthened and the control system was modified to prevent overstressing the aircraft.

== Flight testing ==
Tu-144 suffered from a rush in the design process to the detriment of thoroughness and quality. According to Concorde technical flight manager Brian Calvert, "the rush to get [Tu-144] airborne exacted a heavy penalty later". Concorde's first flight was originally scheduled for February 1968, but was pushed back several times until March 1969 in order to iron out problems and test components more thoroughly. The rush is apparent even in outward timing: the 1963 government decree launching the Tu-144 programme defined that the Tu-144 should fly in 1968; it first flew on the last day of 1968 (31 December) to fulfill government goals set five years earlier.

== Production ==
Sixteen airworthy Tu-144 airplanes were built:

- the prototype Tu-144, registration number 68001
- a pre-production Tu-144, number 77101
- nine production Tu-144S, numbers 77102 to 77110
- five Tu-144D models, numbers 77111 to 77115.

Although its last commercial passenger flight was in 1978, production of the Tu-144 did not cease until 1983, when construction of the final airframe was stopped and left partially complete. The last production aircraft, Tu-144D number 77116, was not completed and was left derelict for many years on Voronezh East airfield. There was at least one ground test airframe for static testing in parallel with the development of prototype 68001.

== Operational history ==
=== Entry into service ===
The introduction of the Tu-144 into passenger service was timed to the 60th anniversary of the Communist revolution, as was duly noted in Soviet officials' speeches delivered at the airport before the inaugural flight – whether the aircraft was actually ready for passenger service was deemed of secondary importance. Even the outward details of the inaugural Tu-144 flight betrayed the haste of its introduction into service: several ceiling panels were ajar, service trays stuck, window shades dropped without being pulled, reading lights did not work, not all toilets worked and a broken ramp delayed departure half an hour. On arrival to Alma-Ata, the Tu-144 was towed back and forth for 25 minutes to align it correctly with the exit ramp. Flight testing time logged on the prototype (68001) was 180 hours; flight testing time until the completion of state acceptance tests was 1509 hours, followed with 835 hours of flight time of service tests until the commencement of passenger service.

The Tu-144S went into service on 26 December 1975, flying mail and freight between Moscow and Alma-Ata in preparation for passenger services, which commenced on 1 November 1977. The type certificate was issued by the USSR Gosaviaregister on 29 October 1977.

The passenger service ran a semi-scheduled service until the first Tu-144D experienced an in-flight failure during a pre-delivery test flight, crash-landing on 23 May 1978 with two crew fatalities. The Tu-144's 55th and last scheduled passenger flight occurred on 1 June 1978.

An Aeroflot freight-only service recommenced using the new production variant Tu-144D ("D" for Dal'nyaya – "long range") aircraft on 23 June 1979, including longer routes from Moscow to Khabarovsk made possible by the more efficient Kolesov RD-36-51 turbojet engines, which also increased the maximum cruising speed to Mach 2.15.

There were only 103 scheduled flights before the Tu-144 was removed from commercial service.

=== Early flights ===
During 102 flights and 181 hours of freight and passenger flight time, the Tu-144S suffered more than 226 failures; 80 of them occurred in flight and 80 of them were severe enough to affect the flight schedule. The most frequent sources of trouble were the flight instruments, navigation gear, radios, and autopilot.

After the inaugural flight, two subsequent flights during the next two weeks were cancelled and the third flight rescheduled. The official reason given by Aeroflot for cancellation was bad weather at Alma-Ata; however when the journalist called the Aeroflot office in Alma-Ata about local weather, the office said that the weather there was perfect and one aircraft had already arrived that morning. Subsequent and significant documented Tu-144 failures included insufficient cabin pressurisation in flight on 27 December 1977, a landing gear switch fault on 29 January 1978 that indicated that the gear was lowered when it was in fact retracted, and engine-exhaust duct overheating causing the flight to be aborted and returned to the takeoff airport on 14 March 1978. Additionally, a metal fatigue problem was discovered in the tip of the aircraft's vertical stabilizer; this was mitigated by adding a titanium doubler plate.

Aleksey Tupolev, Tu-144 chief designer, and two USSR vice-ministers (of aviation industry and of civil aviation) had to be personally present at Domodedovo airport before each scheduled Tu-144 departure to review the condition of the aircraft and make a joint decision on whether it could be released into flight. Subsequently, flight cancellations became less common, as several Tu-144s were docked at Moscow's Domodedovo International Airport.

==== Incident on 25 January 1978 ====
Tu-144 pilot Aleksandr Larin remembers a troublesome flight around 25 January 1978. The flight with passengers suffered the failure of 22 to 24 onboard systems. Seven to eight systems failed before takeoff, but given the large number of foreign TV and radio journalists and also other foreign notables aboard the flight, it was decided to proceed with the flight to avoid the embarrassment of cancellation. After takeoff, failures continued to multiply. While the aircraft was supersonic en route to the destination airport, Tupolev bureau's crisis centre predicted that the front and left landing gear would not extend and that the aircraft would have to land on the right gear alone, at a landing speed of over 300 km/h (190 mph; 160 kn). Due to expected political fallout, Soviet leader Leonid Brezhnev was personally notified of what was going on in the air. With the accumulated failures, an alarm siren went off immediately after takeoff, with sound and volume similar to that of a civil defence warning. The crew could not figure a way to switch it off so the siren stayed on throughout the remaining 75 minutes of the flight. Eventually, the captain ordered the navigator to borrow a pillow from the passengers and stuff it inside the siren's horn. After all the suspense, all landing gear extended and the aircraft landed.

A subsequent flight of Tu-144 on around 30 May 1978, not long before the type was withdrawn from passenger service, involved valve failure on one of the fuel tanks.

=== Cabin noise ===
A problem for passengers was the very high noise level inside the cabin, measuring at least 90–95 dB on average. The noise came from the engines; unlike Concorde, it could only sustain supersonic speeds using afterburners continuously. In addition, the active heat insulation system used for the air conditioning, which used the flow of spent cabin air, was described as excessively noisy. Passengers seated next to each other could have a conversation only with difficulty, and those seated two seats apart could not hear each other even when screaming and had to pass hand-written notes instead. Noise in the rear of the cabin was described as unbearable. (Note: See contemporary passenger reports about the noise problem)

=== Later use ===
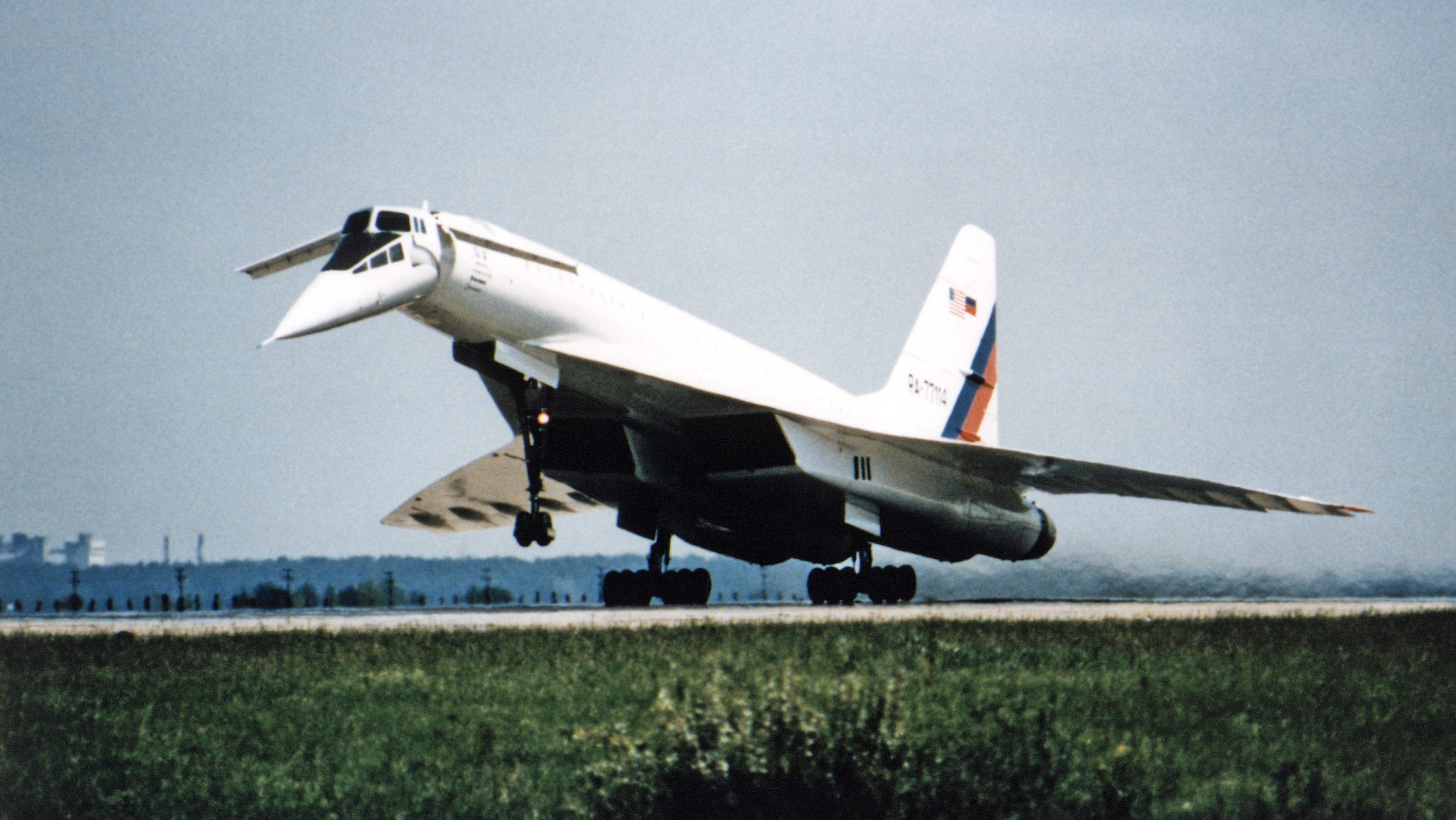
The Tu-144LL used by NASA to carry out research for the High Speed Civil Transport in 1997.

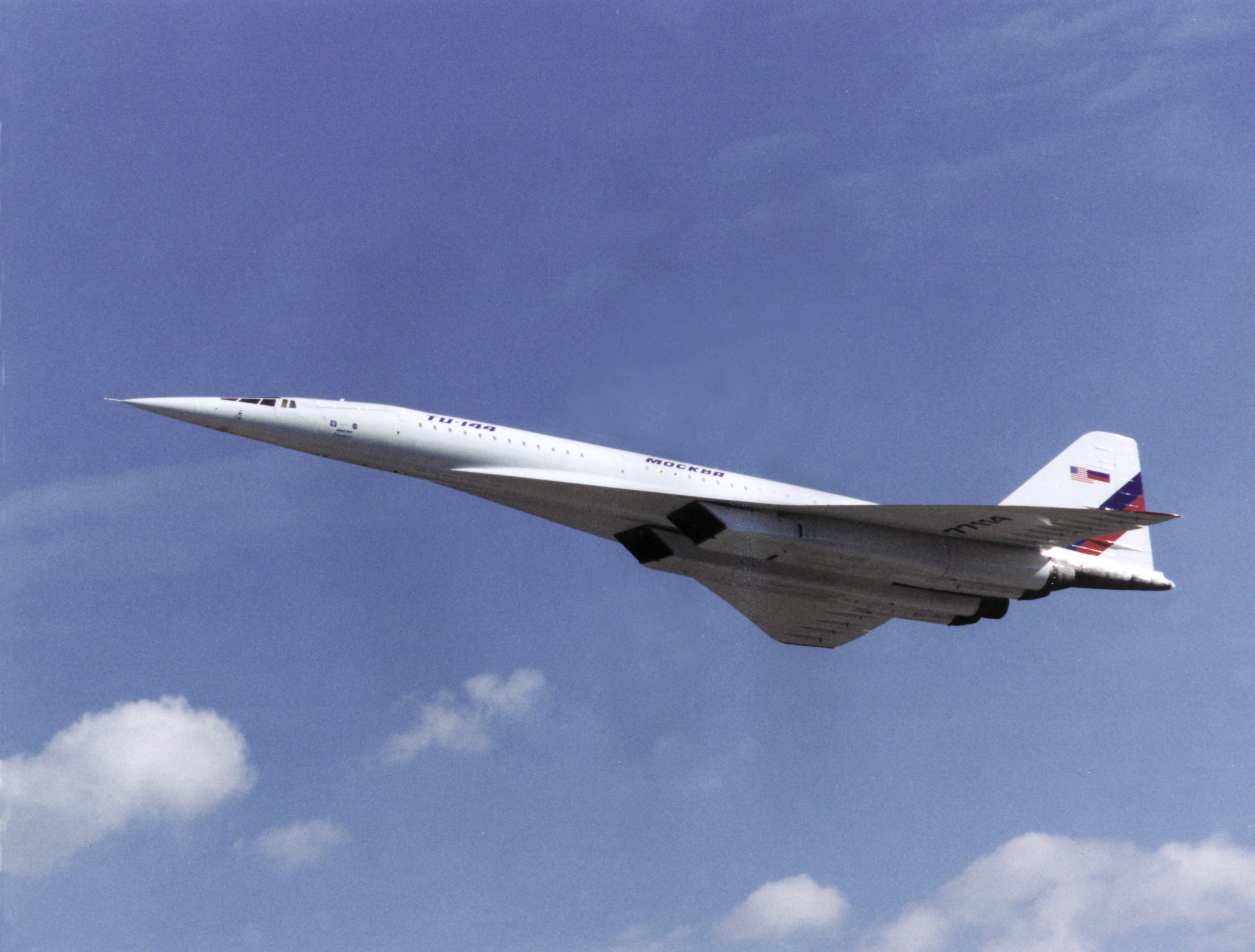
Tu-144LL in flight in 1998.

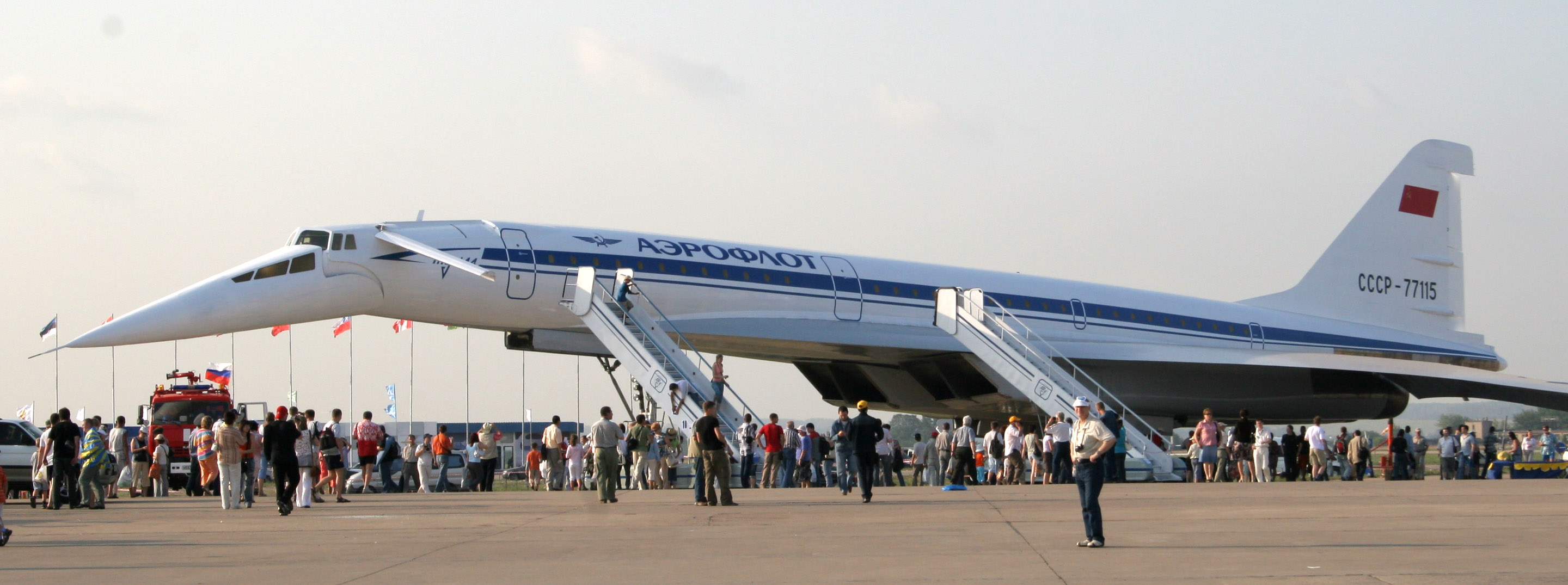
Tu-144 with distinctive droop nose on display at the MAKS Airshow in 2007.

The Tu-144 programme was cancelled by a Soviet government decree on 1 July 1983 that also provided for future use of the remaining Tu-144 aircraft as airborne laboratories. In 1985, Tu-144D were used to train pilots for the Soviet Buran space shuttle. In 1986–1988 Tu-144D No. 77114, built in 1981, was used for medical and biological research of high-altitude atmosphere radiological conditions. Further research was planned but not completed, due to lack of funding.

=== Use by NASA ===
In the early 1990s, Judith de Paul, and her company IBP Aerospace brokered an agreement with Tupolev, NASA, Rockwell and later Boeing. They offered a Tu-144 as a testbed for NASA's High Speed Commercial Research programme, which was intended to design a second-generation supersonic jetliner called the High Speed Civil Transport. In 1995, Tu-144D No. 77114 (with only 82.5 hours of flight time) was taken out of storage and after extensive modification at a cost of US$350 million, designated the Tu-144LL (where LL is a Russian abbreviation for Flying Laboratory, Russian: Летающая Лаборатория, Letayushchaya Laboratoriya). The aircraft made 27 flights in Russia during 1996 and 1997. Though regarded as a technical success, the project was cancelled for lack of funding in 1999.

This aircraft was reportedly sold in 2001 online, but the aircraft sale did not proceed. Tejavia Systems, the company handling the transaction, reported that the deal was not signed as the replacement Kuznetsov NK-321 engines also used in a Tupolev Tu-160 bomber were military hardware and the Russian government would not allow them to be exported.

In 2003, after the retirement of Concorde, there was renewed interest from several wealthy individuals who wanted to use the Tu-144LL for a transatlantic record attempt, despite the high cost of a flight readiness overhaul even if military authorities would authorize the use of NK-321 engines outside Russian Federation airspace.

== Reasons for failure and cancellation ==
=== Limited routes ===
Only one commercial route was ever used, an approximately 3,100 kilometres (1,900 mi) route from Moscow to Alma-Ata (now Almaty), and flights were limited to one a week, despite there being eight Tu-144S certified aircraft available and a number of other routes suitable for supersonic flights, suggesting that the Aeroflot decision-makers had little confidence in the aircraft's commercial viability when passenger service began in 1977.

=== Compressor disc and other failures ===
On 31 August 1980, Tu-144D (77113) suffered an uncontained compressor disc failure in supersonic flight which damaged part of the airframe structure and systems. The crew was able to perform an emergency landing at Engels-2 strategic bomber base.

On 12 November 1981, a Tu-144D's RD-36-51 engine was destroyed during bench tests, leading to a temporary suspension of all Tu-144D flights. It became the final blow, which resulted in the cancellation of the project by the Ministry of Aviation Industry and the Ministry of Civil Aviation.

One of the Tu-144Ds (77114, a.k.a. aircraft 101) suffered a crack across the bottom panel of its wing.

=== Economic inefficiency ===
Global trends facilitated the transition of jet transportation from a luxury available only to the elite, to a widespread form of mass transportation. Although the 1973 oil crisis did not directly impact decision-making processes within the Soviet Union, the expansion of Soviet air travel in the late 1970s made the supply of aviation fuel a growth constraint, and it was obvious that potential Western buyers were heavily dissuaded by high fuel prices. By the late 1970s, Soviet promotional efforts shifted to the Ilyushin Il-86, a more economically efficient jumbo jet that went on to become the country's flagship airliner. Moon notes that in 1976, Aeroflot was promoting the Il-86 over the Tu-144, despite the latter's incipient and long-awaited entry into service.

G.A. Cheryomukhin, an aerodynamics engineer who took part in the design and certification of Tu-144, wrote that the Ministry of Civil Aviation was concerned that the continuation and expansion of the SST's operation would have forced the Ministry to make significant long-term investments.

Moon concluded that economic efficiency alone would not have doomed the Tu-144 altogether; continuation of token flights for reasons of political prestige would have been possible, if only the aircraft itself would have allowed for it, but it did not. The Tu-144 was to a large extent intended to be, and trumpeted as, a symbol of Soviet technological prestige and superiority.

=== Tupolev design bureau and rivalry with Ilyushin ===
Fridlyander and Moon point out that by the early 1970s, Tupolev's bureau had to work on other projects, including the Tu-154 and Tu-204 passenger aircraft, and the Tu-22M and Tu-160 bombers. Despite large and high-priority resource investment in the Tu-144 development programme and the fact that a large part of the whole Soviet R&D infrastructure was subordinated to the Tu-144 project, parallel project development overwhelmed the bureau causing it to lose focus and make design errors.

Alexander Poukhov, one of the Tu-144 design engineers who subsequently rose to be one of the bureau's senior designers, estimated in 1998 that the Tu-144 project was 10–15 years beyond the USSR's capabilities at that time. (Note: Poukhov: "My opinion is that at that time, it was an aircraft that was ten or even fifteen years ahead of its time and the capabilities of the country", in an interview to PBS documentary Supersonic Spies.)

Moon suggests that Tupolev's difficulties in developing the Tu-144, together with a need to prioritize bomber development, prompted Soviet leaders to shift airliner development to the rival Ilyushin design bureau, which had recently introduced the successful Il-76 military transport and was developing the Il-86 to move much larger numbers of passengers at a much lower per-seat cost than the Tu-144. Moon contrasts the Ilyushin bureau's careful advance research into operating costs and its marketing surveys of Aeroflot customers with the "technocratic futurism" embodied by the Tu-144, suggesting that Soviet leaders recognized that the Il-86 better addressed real-world transportation needs in the Soviet Union and elsewhere.

== Cessation of Tu-144D production ==
The decision to cease Tu-144D production was issued on 7 January 1982, followed by a USSR government decree dated 1 July 1983 to cease the whole Tu-144 programme and to use produced Tu-144 aircraft as flying laboratories.

=== Soviet leadership failure ===
Howard Moon, who authored "Soviet SST" in 1989, attributed the downfall of the ostensibly promising Tu-144 programme to the Soviet leadership's decision to leverage it as a political weapon against the West. He regarded the programme as both an "astounding achievement" and a "magnificent failure".

The rushed introduction to service of poorly tested aircraft happened previously with another Tupolev project that had high political visibility and prestige: the Tu-104 passenger jet-liner was the first successful Soviet passenger jet in service. In a decision-making similar to the Tu-144-story, the Soviet government introduced the Tu-104 into passenger service before satisfactory stability and controllability had been achieved. During high-altitude and high-speed flight the aircraft was prone to longitudinal instability, and also at high altitudes, it had a narrow range of angle of attack separating the aircraft from stalls known as coffin corner. These problems created the preconditions for spin dives, that happened twice before the Tu-104 was eventually properly tested and the problem was resolved.

=== Personal factors ===
Leonid Selyakov, a notable Soviet aircraft designer, considered the primary reason for ending the Soviet Supersonic Transport project to be the personal factor—the role of the Chief Designer, who failed to show due courage and defend his Bureau's brainchild following the tragic event near Yegoryevsk. "Cowardice and progress are incompatible," Selyakov sternly summarized.

G.A. Cheryomukhin identified several major "blows" to the Tu-144 project. The first three were the death of Andrei Tupolev in 1972, the disaster at the Paris Air Show in 1973, and the death of the active and authoritative Minister of the USSR's Aviation Industry Pyotr Dementyev (1907–1977). Dementyev had been at the helm of the domestic aviation industry for many years and was one of the champions of the SST program. The fourth blow came with Aleksey Tupolev's direction on 30 May 1978, to cancel the SST flight and temporarily halt aircraft operations. Cheryomukhin bitterly noted, "...our own leader – A.A. Tupolev – personally stopped the operation of the Tu-144, depriving the world of a source of evidence of the rationality of supersonic flight over land..."

== After project cancellation ==
After ceasing the Tu-144 programme, Tu-144D No. 77114 (aircraft 101 or 08-2) carried out test flights between the 13–20 July 1983 to establish 13 world records registered with the Fédération Aéronautique Internationale (FAI). These records established an altitude of 18,200 metres (59,700 ft) with a range of loads up to 30 tonnes, and a sustained speed of 2,032 km/h (1,263 mph; 1,097 kn) over a closed circuit of up to 2,000 km (1,200 mi; 1,100 nmi) with similar loads.

To put the numbers in perspective, Concorde's service ceiling under a typical Transatlantic flight payload of 10 tonnes was 18,290 m (60,000 ft), (Note: The actual altitude of the regular Concorde flight depends on the state of troposphere, which in turn depends on latitude of the flight. Concorde flights across the tropical region is 60,000 ft, with flights across North Atlantic at only 56–58,000 ft to ensure the most economic service.) and this is higher than the record set by the Tu-144D. According to unverified sources, during a 26 March 1974 test flight a Concorde reached its maximum speed ever of 2,370 km/h (1,470 mph; 1,280 kn) (Mach 2.23) at an altitude of 19,415 m (63,700 ft), and during subsequent test flights reached a maximum altitude of 20,700 m (67,900 ft).

Concorde was originally designed for cruising speeds up to Mach 2.2, but its regular service speed was limited to Mach 2.02 to extend airframe life. One of Tupolev's web site pages states that "TU-144 and TU-160 aircraft operation has demonstrated expediency of limitation of cruise supersonic speed of M=2.0 to provide structure service life and to limit cruising altitude".

== Variants ==
- Tu-144 – (izdeliye 044 – article 044) The sole prototype Tu-144 aircraft
- Tu-144S – (izdeliye 004 – article 004) Six redesigned production aircraft powered by Kuznetsov NK-144A engines in widely spaced nacelles, and redesigned undercarriage
- Tu-144D – (izdeliye 004D – article 004D)(D-Dahl'neye – long-range) Production Tu-144 aircraft powered by Koliesov RD36-51 non-afterburning engines. One aircraft converted from Tu-144 СССР-77105(c/n10031) and five production aircraft (СССР-77111 [c/n10062] to СССР-77115 [c/n 10091]) plus one (СССР-77116) uncompleted
- Tu-144DA – A project study, assigned the number Tu-144DA, increased the wing area and the take-off weight, and replaced the engines with the RD-36-61 which had 5% more thrust. The Tu-144DA increased fuel capacity from 98,000 kg to 125,000 kg with a higher maximum certified take-off weight (MCTOW) of 235,000 kg. and range up to 7,500 km (4,700 mi).
- Tu-144LL – One Tu-144D aircraft (СССР-77114 [c/n10082]) converted to a flying laboratory with four Kuznetsov NK-321 afterburning turbofan engines and re-registered RA-77114. The first flight took place on 29 November 1996 with the 27th and last flight on 14 April 1999.

=== Proposed military versions ===
Early configurations of the Tu-144 were based on the unbuilt Tupolev Tu-135 bomber, retaining the latter aircraft's canard layout, wings and nacelles. Deriving from the Tu-135 bomber, Tupolev's early design for supersonic passenger airplane was code-named Tu-135P before acquiring the Tu-144 project code.

Over the course of the Tu-144 project, the Tupolev bureau created designs of a number of military versions of Tu-144 but none were ever built. In the early 1970s, Tupolev was developing the Tu-144R intended to carry and air-launch up to three solid-fueled ICBMs. The launch was to be performed from within Soviet air space, with the aircraft accelerating to its maximum speed before releasing the missiles. The original design was based on the Tu-144S, but later changed to be derived from the Tu-144D. Another version of the design was to carry air-launched long-range cruise missiles similar to the Kh-55. The study of this version envisioned the use of liquid hydrogen for the afterburners.

In the late 1970s, Tupolev contemplated the development of a long-range heavy interceptor (DP-2) based on the Tu-144D also able to escort bombers on long-range missions. Later this project evolved into an aircraft for electronic countermeasures (ECM) to suppress enemy radars and facilitate bomber's penetration through enemy air defenses (Tu-144PP). In the early 1980s this functionality was supplanted with theatre and strategic reconnaissance (Tu-144PR).

The dimmer civil prospects for Tu-144 were becoming apparent the more Tupolev tried to "sell" the aircraft to the military. One of the last attempts to sell a military version of the Tu-144 was the Tu-144MR, a project for a long-range reconnaissance aircraft for the Soviet Navy intended to provide targeting information to the Navy's ships and submarines on sea and oceanic theaters of operations. Another proposed navy version was to have a strike capability (two Kh-45 air-to-surface cruise missiles), along with a reconnaissance function. The Tu-144MR was also to have served as a carrier aircraft for the Tupolev Voron reconnaissance drone, designed to compete with the Lockheed D-21 and influenced by it, but the project never materialised.

The military was unreceptive to Tupolev's approaches. Vasily Reshetnikov, the commander of Soviet Long-Range Aviation and subsequently, a vice-commander of the Soviet Air Force, remembers how, in 1972, he was dismayed by Tupolev's attempts to offer for military use the aircraft that "fell short of its performance target, was beset by reliability problems, fuel-thirsty and difficult to operate".

Reshetnikov goes on to remember:

The development and construction of the supersonic airliner, the future Tu-144, was included in the five-year plan and was under the auspices of the influential D.F. Ustinov (then Soviet minister of defence and confidant of Brezhnev, who represented interests of defence industries lobby in opposition to the military) who regarded this mission as a personal responsibility – not so much to his country and people as to "dear Leonid Il'ych" (Brezhnev) whom he literally worshipped, sometimes to the point of shamelessness... Yet the supersonic passenger jet was apparently not making headway and, to the dismay of its curator, it looked as though Brezhnev might be disappointed. It was then that Dmitry Fedorovich (Ustinov) jumped at someone's idea to foist Aeroflot's "bride in search of a wedding" on the military. After it had been rejected in bomber guise, Ustinov used the Military Industrial Commission (one of the most influential Soviet government bodies) to promote the aircraft to the Strategic Aviation as a reconnaissance or ECM platform, or both. It was clear to me that these aircraft could not possibly work in concert with any bomber or missile carrier formation; likewise I could not imagine them operating solo as "Flying Dutchmen" in a war scenario, therefore I resolutely turned down the offer.

Naval Aviation Commander Aleksandr Alekseyevich Mironenko, followed suit:

Ustinov could not be put off that easily. He managed to persuade the Navy C-in-C (admiral) S.G. Gorshkov who agreed to accept the Tu-144 for Naval Aviation service as a long-range reconnaissance aircraft without consulting anyone on the matter. Mironenko rebelled against this decision, but the commander-in-chief would not hear of heed – the issue is decided, period. On learning of this I was extremely alarmed: if Mironenko had been pressured into taking the Tu-144, this meant I was going to be next. I made a phone call to Aleksandr Alekseyevich, urging him to take radical measures; I needn't have called because even without my urging Mironenko was giving his C-in-C a hard time. Finally Ustinov got wind of the mutiny and summoned Mironenko to his office. They had a long and heated discussion but eventually Mironenko succeeded in proving that Ustinov's ideas were unfounded. That was the last time we heard of Tu-144.

== Operators ==
Soviet Union

- Ministry of Aviation Industry
- Aeroflot Soviet Airlines

United States

- NASA

== Aircraft on display ==
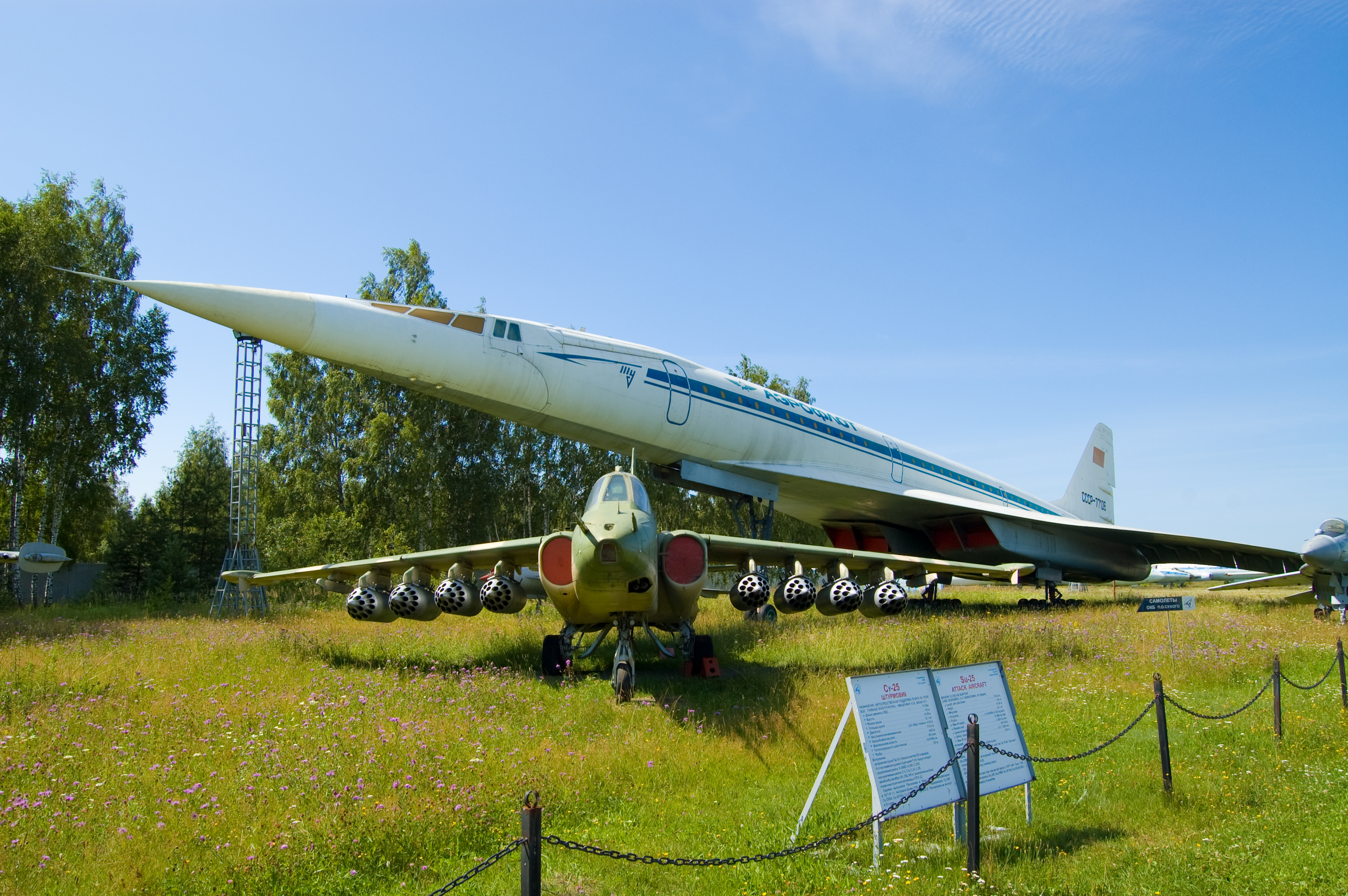
Tu-144S#77106 preserved at Monino museum

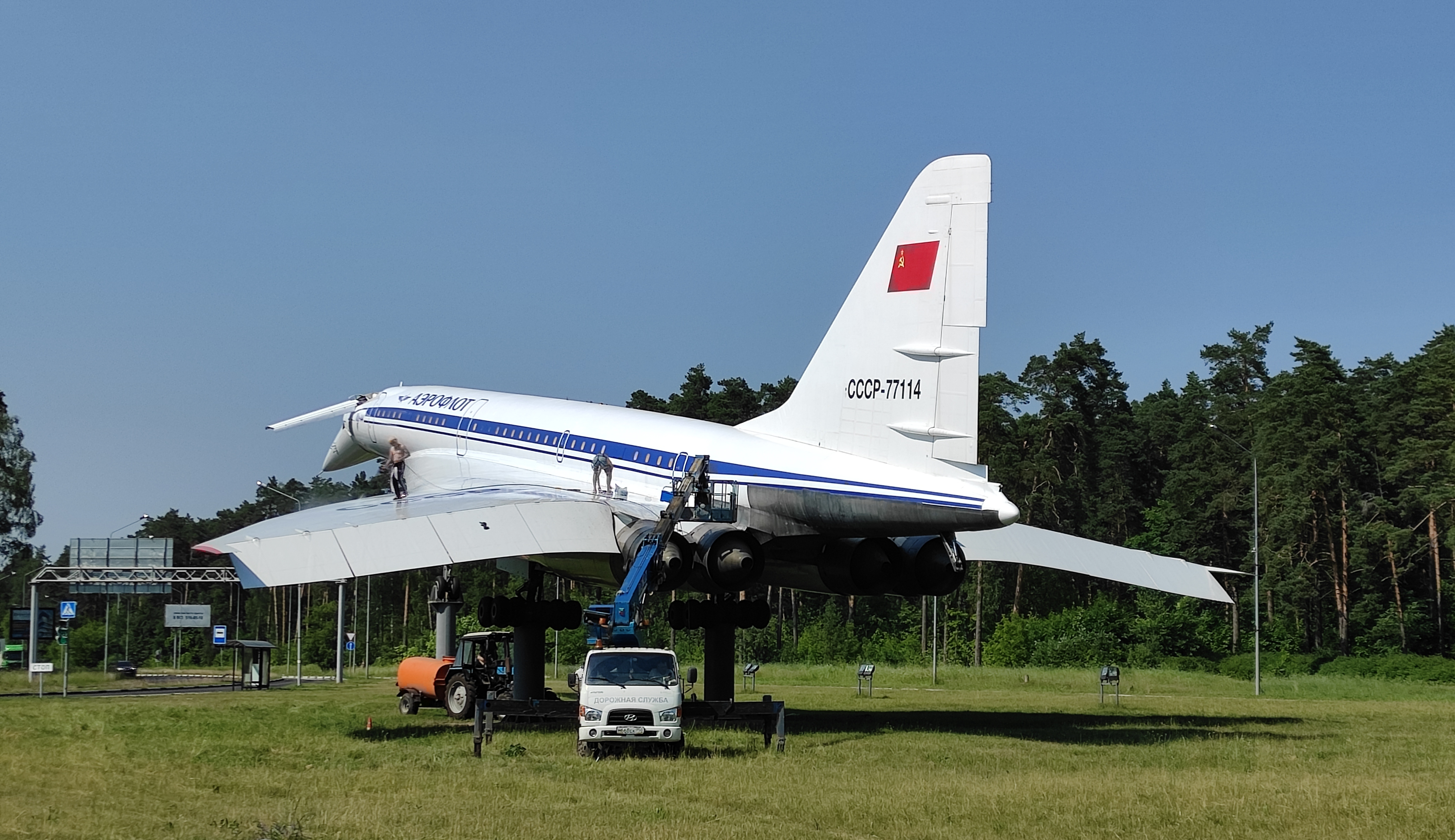
Seasonal maintenance of memorial Tu-144 reg. No. 77114 in Zhukovsky, Russia

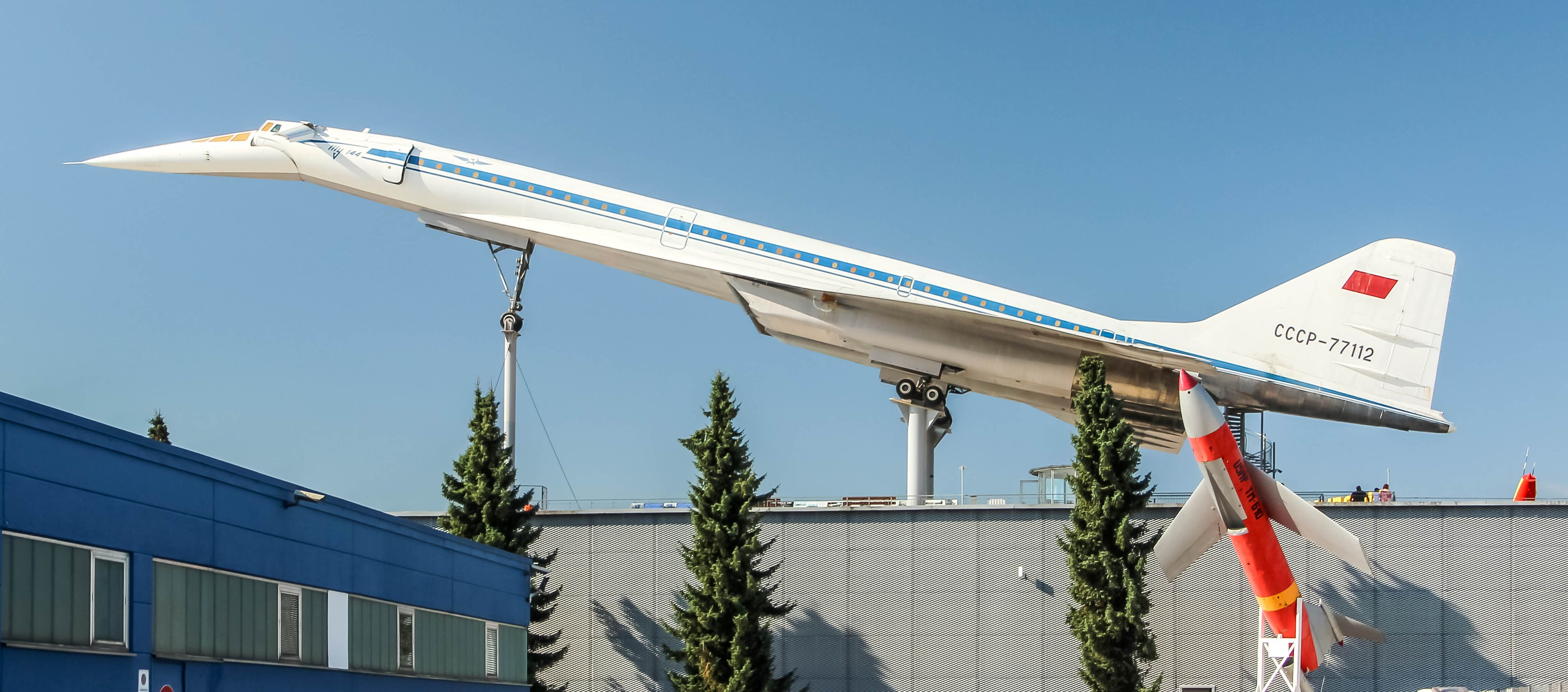
Tu-144D#77112 on display at Technik Museum Sinsheim, Germany

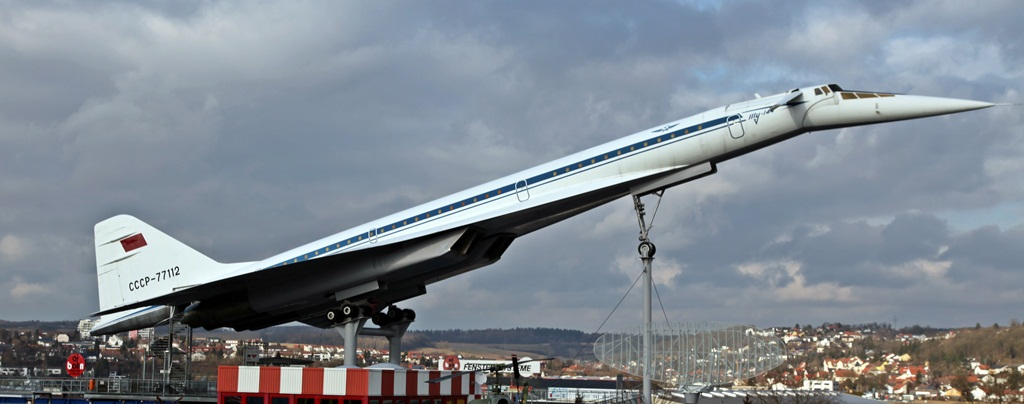
Tu-144 at Sinsheim Museum.

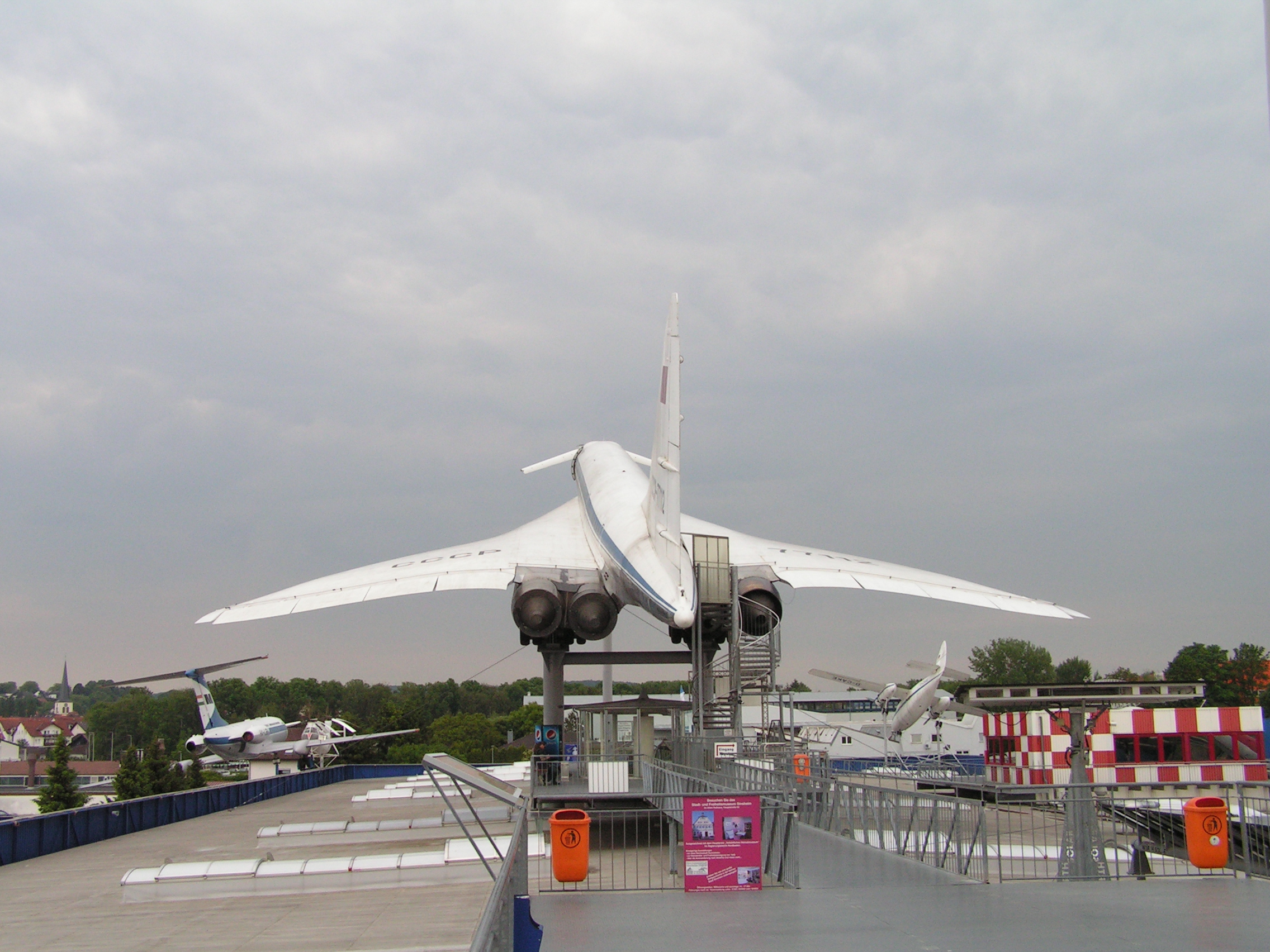
TU-144 at Sinsheim Museum.

While several Tu-144s were donated to museums in Moscow Monino, Samara and Ulyanovsk, at least two Tu-144D remained in open storage in Moscow Zhukovsky.

As of June 2010, two aircraft (tail numbers СССР-77114 and СССР-77115) are located outdoors at Gromov Flight Research Institute, Zhukovsky (at coordinates 55.569786°N 38.155652°E and 55.571776°N 38.152304°E). Previously, they were displayed at MAKS Airshows. Tail number 77115 was bought in 2005 by the Heros Club of Zhukovsky and still on display at MAKS as of 2019. In 2019, tail number 77114 was repainted in Aeroflot livery and put on display in front of the Gromov Flight Research institute main gate.

A Tu-144S, registration СССР-77106, is on display at Central Air Force Museum of Russia in Monino. Its maiden flight was on 4 March 1975, the final one on 29 February 1980. The aircraft was used to assess the effectiveness of the air-conditioning systems and to solve some problems on the fuel system. It can be considered the first production aircraft, being the first to be equipped for commercial use and delivered to Aeroflot. The first operational flight was on 26 December 1975 between Moscow and Alma-Ata carrying cargo and mail.

Another Tu-144, tail number СССР-77107, is on open display in Kazan and located at 55.821714°N 49.135064°E. The aircraft was constructed in 1975 and was a production model intended for passenger use. However, it was only used during test flights. On 29 March 1976 it made its last flight to Kazan. This aircraft was put on sale on eBay in 2017.

TU-144S, tail number СССР-77108, is on display in the museum of Samara State Aerospace University (53.240367°N 50.364092°E). It made its maiden flight on 12 December 1975, and its final flight on 27 August 1987. Development works on navigation system were made in this aircraft as well as flight-director approach.

TU-144S, tail number СССР-77110, is on display at the Ulyanovsk Aircraft Museum in Ulyanovsk. Maiden flight occurred on 14 February 1977, the final Flight on 1 June 1984. This aircraft was the second of the two aircraft used for regular passengers' flights on Moscow – Alma-Ata route. In 1977 it flew to Paris to take part in the XXXII Paris Air Show at Le Bourget Airport. This was the last appearance of a Tu-144 in West Europe. СССР-77110 was the last aircraft produced of the model Tu-144S, powered with Kuznetsov NK-144A engines. In the first half of 2008 the cabin was open for visits and between August and September was restored and painted in the original Aeroflot livery.

The only Tu-144 on display outside the former Soviet Union, tail number СССР-77112, was acquired by the Auto & Technikmuseum Sinsheim in Germany, where it was shipped – not flown – in 2001 and where it now stands, in its original Aeroflot livery, on display next to an Air France Concorde. As of 2017, the Technikmuseum Sinsheim remains the only museum in the world where the Tu-144 and Concorde are on display together.

== Accidents ==
=== Paris Air Show crash ===
Flight profile of Tu-144 and Mirage IIIR

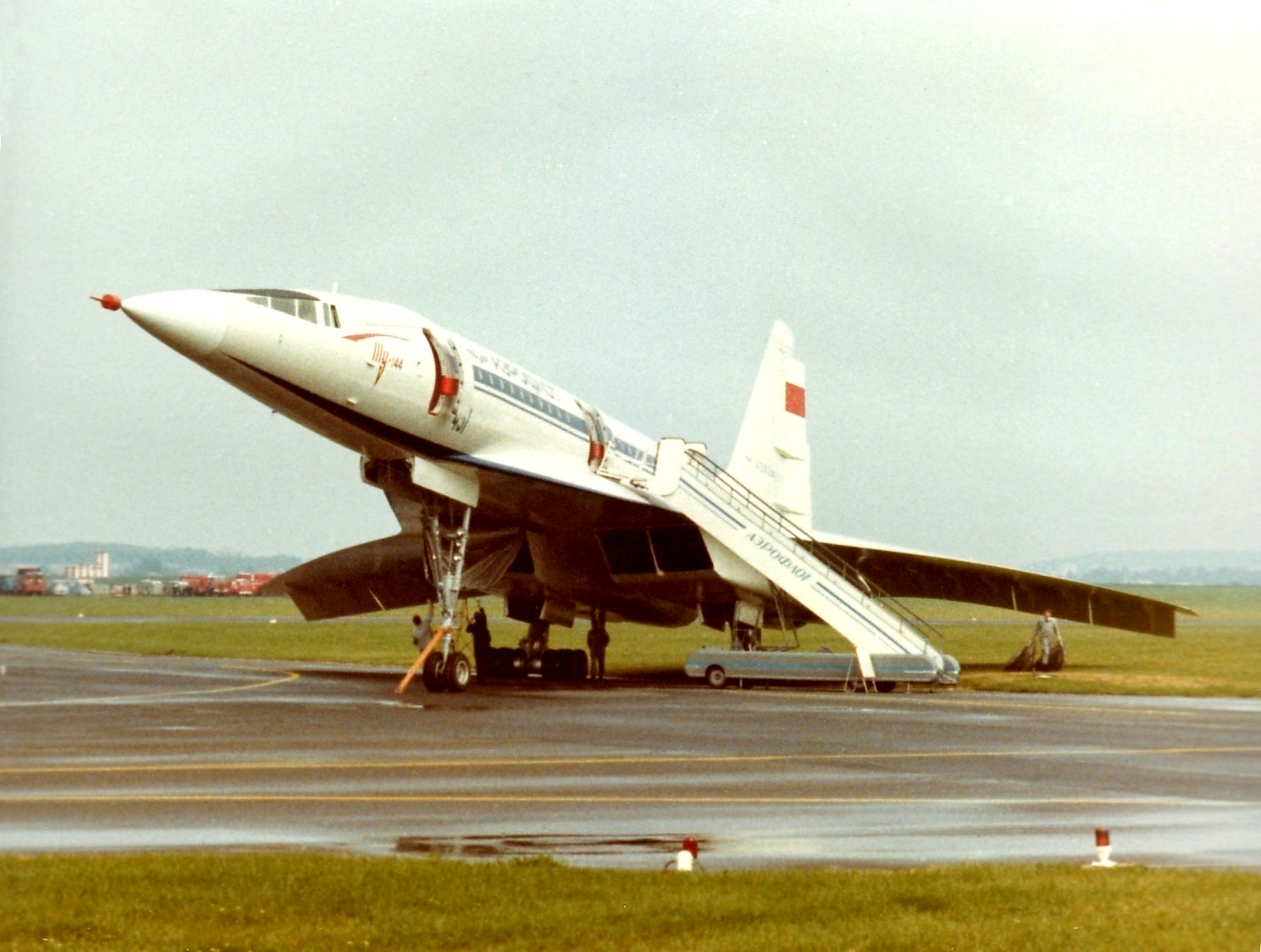
Tu-144 at the Paris Air Show, 2 June 1973, the day before the crash.

At the Paris Air Show on 3 June 1973, the development programme of the Tu-144 suffered severely when the first Tu-144S production airliner (reg 77102) crashed.

At the end of the officially approved demonstration flight, which was an exact repeat of the previous day's display, instead of landing as expected, the aircraft entered a very steep climb before making a violent downwards manoeuvre. As it tried to recover, the aircraft broke apart and crashed, destroying 15 houses and killing all six people on board the Tu-144 and eight more on the ground.

Gordon et al. state that the flight crew had departed from the approved flight profile for the display. They were under instructions to outperform the Concorde display by all means. During the unapproved, and therefore unrehearsed manoeuvres, the stability and control augmentation system was not operating. If it had been, it would have prevented the loads that caused the port wing to fail.

The main theory for the crash was that the Tu-144 tried to avoid a French Mirage chase-plane that was attempting to photograph its canards, which were very advanced for the time, and that the French and Soviet governments colluded with each other to cover up such details. The flight of the Mirage was denied in the original French report of the incident. More recent reports have admitted the existence of the Mirage (and the fact that the Soviet crew was not told about the Mirage's flight), though not its role in the crash. The official press release did state: "though the inquiry established that there was no real risk of collision between the two aircraft, the Soviet pilot was likely to have been surprised".

Moon writes that the investigation was clouded by political considerations from the outset, and that an exoneration of the Tu-144 from a technical and design standpoint was in the interests of both countries, as France was seeking Concorde overflight rights from the Soviet Union. Moon characterized the final accident report as being "remarkable more for what it omitted than what it included."

=== Yegoryevsk crash ===
On 23 May 1978, the Tu-144 supersonic passenger jet was to make a test flight before delivery to Aeroflot. At an altitude of 3,000 m, a fire started at the APU located in the port wing. A turn was made to return to the airport and both engines located in the right wing (engines no. 3 and 4) were shut down and the aircraft began to lose altitude. Fire trailed the aircraft and the cockpit filled with smoke. Subsequently, the no. 1 (outer left) engine failed. Six minutes after the fire started, the crew managed to belly-land the aircraft in a field near Yegoryevsk. On impact, the nose cone collapsed under the fuselage, penetrating the compartment in which two flight engineers were seated, killing both. It was later determined that, 27 minutes prior to the ignition, a fuel line had ruptured, causing eight tons of fuel to leak into several compartments on the right wing. The fuel readings were judged incorrect by the flight engineers and thus were not reported to the commander. In addition to the two flight engineers killed on impact, six other crewmembers were injured. The Tu-144 was withdrawn from passenger service soon afterward, though a 2019 post-mortem by CNN reported that it was already "on its way out" before then.

== Specifications (Tu-144D) ==
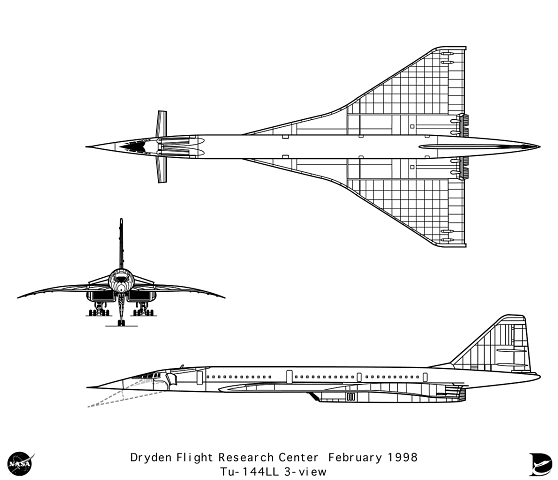
Tu-144LL drawing

Data from

General characteristics

- Crew: 3
- Capacity: 150 passengers (11 first class & 139 tourist class)
- Length: 65.7 m (215 ft 7 in)
- Wingspan: 28.8 m (94 ft 6 in)
- Height: 12.55 m (41 ft 2 in)
- Wing area: 506.35 m^{2} (5,450.3 sq ft)
- Empty weight: 99,200 kg (218,699 lb)
- Gross weight: 125,000 kg (275,578 lb)
- Max takeoff weight: 207,000 kg (456,357 lb)
- Fuel capacity: 93,000 kg (205,000 lb)
- Powerplant: 4 × Kolesov RD-36-51 turbojets, 240 kN (54,000 lbf) thrust each

Performance

- Maximum speed: 2,500 km/h (1,600 mph, 1,300 kn)
- Maximum speed: Mach 2.15
- Cruise speed: 2,125 km/h (1,320 mph, 1,147 kn)
- Range: 6,500 km (4,000 mi, 3,500 nmi)
- Service ceiling: 20,000 m (66,000 ft)
- Rate of climb: 50 m/s (9,800 ft/min)
- Wing loading: 410.96 kg/m^{2} (84.17 lb/sq ft)
- Thrust/weight: 0.44

== See also ==
Related development

- Tupolev Tu-244
- Tupolev Tu-444

Aircraft of comparable role, configuration, and era

- Concorde
- Boeing 2707
- Lockheed L-2000

Related lists

- List of jet airliners
