= Leonid Selyakov =

Soviet aircraft designer (1916–2002)

Leonid Leonidovich Selyakov
- Леонид Леонидович Селяков
- Born: 22 April 1916; Kiev, Russian Empire (now Kyiv, Ukraine)
- Died: 16 October 2002 (aged 86); Moscow, Russia
- Awards: Order of Lenin; Order of the Patriotic War, 2nd class; Order of the Red Banner of Labour; Order of the Red Star; Lenin Prize (1957); USSR State Prize (1972)
- Scientific career
- Fields: Mechanical engineering, Aerospace engineering

Leonid Leonidovich Selyakov (Russian: Леонид Леонидович Селяков; 22 April 1916 – 16 October 2002) was a Soviet aircraft designer, a laureate of the Lenin Prize (1957) and the USSR State Prize (1972).

== Biography ==
Selyakov was born on 22 April 1916 in Kiev into the family of a land surveying engineer. After finishing seven years of school in 1930, he began working in his father’s expedition and subsequently at the Kiev Central Aviation Repair Base of Dobrolyot.

From 1932 to 1941, he worked at the Central Aerohydrodynamic Institute in the brigade of Vladimir Petlyakov. He participated in the development of the ANT-20 Maxim Gorky and the and ANT-42 (TB-7) aircraft.

In 1938, Selyakov became head of the technical design group and deputy head of the fuselage brigade at OKB-16, which was created after the arrest of Andrei Tupolev on the basis of his design bureau.

During the Great Patriotic War, he first worked at Plant No. 22 and, from 1943, served as deputy chief designer at OKB-22 under Vladimir Myasishchev, until the bureau was closed in January 1946. After the bureau’s evacuation to Kazan in 1942, Selyakov’s brigade worked on the installation of a heavy machine gun on the Pe-2.

In 1946 he was transferred to OKB-115 under Alexander Yakovlev, where he worked until 1951. He led the design of the jet fighters Yak-19, Yak-25 and the experimental Yak-1000. In April 1951, following the re‑establishment of Myasishchev’s OKB-23, he was appointed its deputy chief designer.

Selyakov was involved in the design of the strategic bomber M-4 and the modernisation of the 3М. For his achievements in designing these aircraft, he became a laureate of the Lenin Prize in 1957 as part of the OKB-23 team and was awarded the Order of Lenin.

From 1952, he worked on the design of the supersonic strategic bomber M-50.

From 1959 to 1961, Selyakov worked at the design bureau of Vladimir Chelomey.

In 1962, he returned to the Tupolev design bureau. He participated in the development of the ANT-20, ANT-42, DB-LK, M-4, M-29, M-50, M-56, Pe-2I, RB-17, Yak-14M, Yak-19, Yak-25, Yak-36, Yak-1000, and others.

For more than 25 years, he served as the chief designer of the Tupolev Tu-134 airliner.

In 1979, Selyakov was appointed leading designer for an advanced medium‑range airliner, which later received the designation Tupolev Tu-204. Despite lacking a formal higher education, he became one of the leading specialists in Soviet aircraft construction.

He died on 16 October 2002 in Moscow and was buried at the Khimki Cemetery.

== Awards ==
In 1957, Selyakov was awarded the Lenin Prize for the creation of the M-4 strategic jet bomber, and in 1972, he received the USSR State Prize for the creation of the Tu-134 and its modifications.

== Publications ==
- Ternistyy put v nikuda: Zapiski aviakonstruktora (A Thorny Path to Nowhere: Notes of an Aircraft Designer). Moscow, 1997.
- Chelovek, sreda, mashina: Zapiski aviakonstruktora (Man, Environment, Machine: Notes of an Aircraft Designer). Moscow, 1998.
- Maloizvestnyye stranitsy tvorcheskoy deyatelnosti konstruktora V. M. Myasishcheva (Little‑known Pages of the Creative Work of Designer V. M. Myasishchev).
