= 1978 Yegoryevsk Tupolev Tu-144 crash =

1978 Soviet aircraft accident

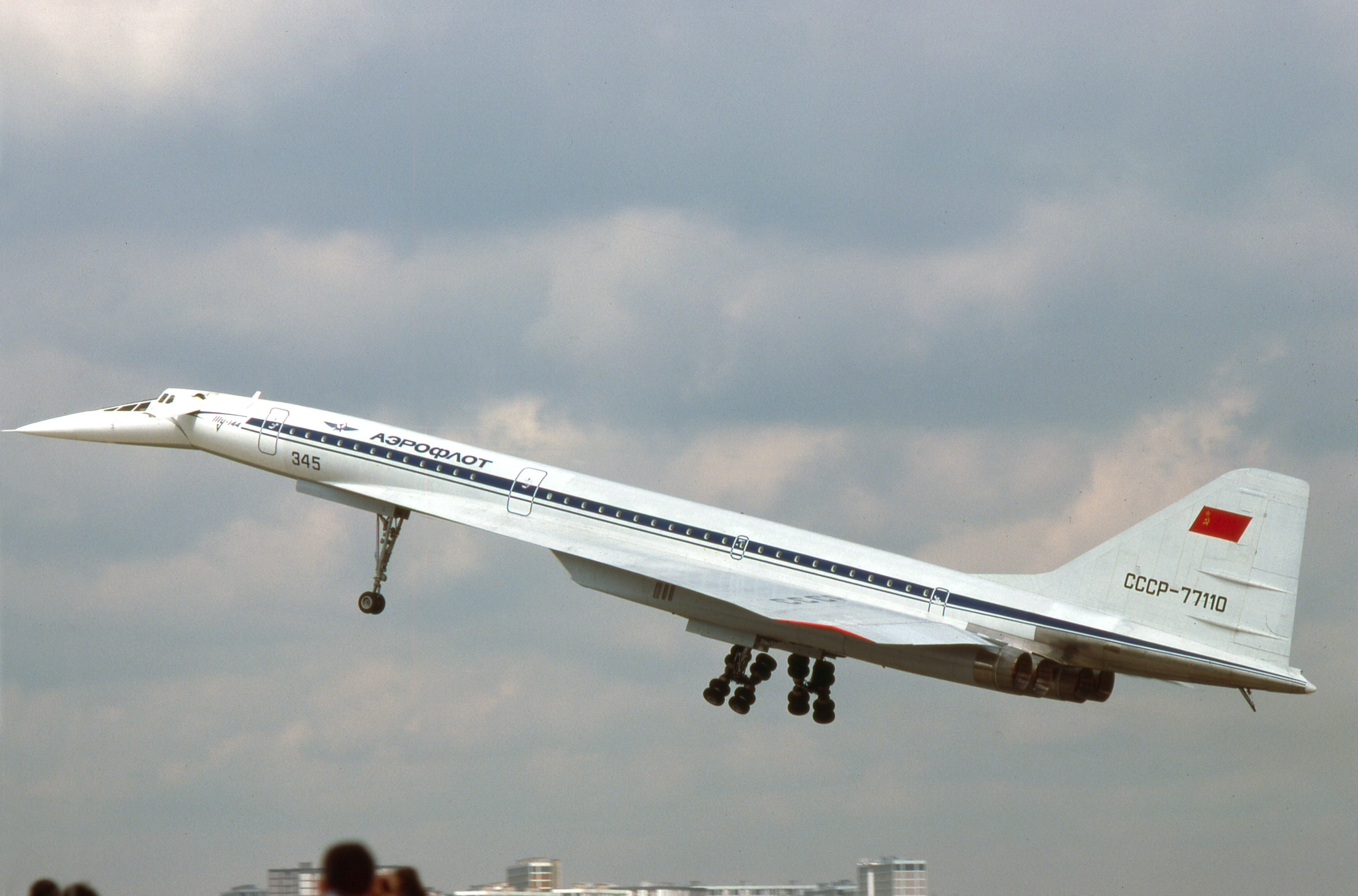
- CCCP-77110, Same type aircraft to the Tu-144 involved in the crash

Accident
- Date: 23 May 1978
- Summary: Crash landing following in-flight fire due to fuel leak
- Site: Near Yegoryevsk, Moscow Oblast, Russian SFSR, Soviet Union (now in Russia); 55°23′41″N 38°51′38″E

Aircraft
- Aircraft type: Tupolev Tu-144D
- Operator: Aeroflot
- Registration: CCCP-77111
- Flight origin: Ramenskoye Airport
- Destination: Ramenskoye Airport
- Occupants: 8
- Crew: 8
- Fatalities: 2
- Survivors: 6

During a test flight of a Tupolev Tu-144 on 23 May 1978, the aircraft suffered a fuel leak, which led to an in-flight fire in the right wing, forcing the shutdown of two of the aircraft's four engines. One of the two remaining engines subsequently failed, forcing the crew to make a belly landing in a field near Yegoryevsk, Moscow Oblast. Two flight engineers were killed in the ensuing crash, but the remaining six crew members survived. The accident prompted a ban on passenger flights of the Tu-144, which had already been beset by numerous problems, leading to a lack of interest that ultimately resulted in the Tu-144 program's cancellation.

== Aircraft and crew ==
The aircraft was a supersonic Tupolev Tu-144D, registered CCCP-77111, built at the Voronezh Aircraft Production Association facility and destined for Soviet flag carrier Aeroflot. It had first flown on 27 April 1978 and completed test flights on 12 May, 16 May, and 18 May, as well as another test flight earlier on the day of the accident. The accident flight was to have been the aircraft's sixth test flight. Eight crewmembers were on board.

== Accident ==
The aircraft took off from Ramenskoye Airport near Moscow at 17:30 local time on 23 May 1978. The crew intended to perform a series of tests on the aircraft's generators, engines, cabin leakage, and controllability at 12,000 metres (39,000 ft). Following the completion of the initial series of tests, the crew descended to 3,000 metres (9,800 ft) to test the aircraft's auxiliary power unit (APU). At 18:44:44 local time, the crew started the APU. Shortly thereafter, at 18:49:15, the crew shut off the APU. Nine seconds later, a fire alarm was triggered; the number 3 engine was shut down at 18:49:31. The crew decided to attempt a return to Ramenskoye Airport. At 18:51:14, the number 4 engine shut down. The crew subsequently noticed a burning smell and thick smoke in the cabin. The number one engine then shut down at 18:53:27; with three of the aircraft's four engines shut down, it was impossible to return to the airport. At 18:55:18, the aircraft belly landed in a field in the Yegoryevsky District, roughly 46 kilometres (29 miles; 25 nmi) from Ramenskoye Airport. The aircraft touched down with the landing gear retracted, at a speed of approximately 380 km/h (210 kn; 240 mph). The nose cone collapsed on impact, penetrating a compartment in which two flight engineers were seated and killing them both, while the remaining six crewmembers survived the crash. It was not until about an hour after the crash that the fire was extinguished by firefighters.

== Investigation ==
The aircraft crash investigation mainly focused on a fuel leak caused by fatigue failure of an experimental fuel pipe in the power plant zone. The pipe was instrumented with a temperature sensor. The official report concluded the fuel leak likely started at 18:18 hours at a rate of 220 kg/min, totaling an estimated 8000 kg fuel loss. A spark from the APU ignited fuel vapor, leading to a fire and engine failure.

After the accident, extensive tests found vibrations from internal fuel flow caused unexpected fatigue damage to the fuel pipelines. These unfamiliar vibrations, up to 1500 Hz compared to the expected 100 Hz, combined with certain pipeline cleaning methods, resulted in the premature wear of the pipeline. Other factors included hydraulic shocks from unusually high pressure. Design changes to the APU fuel system were critical in causing the disaster.

During the acceptance test flight, the crew, aware of uncalibrated fuel system sensors, ignored the fuel contents gauges and relied on the flowmeters. A fatal error was made when they dismissed gauge readings, despite acknowledging significant tank contents discrepancies. The fuel leak led to fuel accumulation in multiple compartments, including the ones above the APU. The crew ignored evident leak signs to keep the testing on schedule.

An attempt to start the APU, which likely failed due to excess fuel and compressor stall, led to the immediate ignition of fuel across the aircraft. Fire alarms from different locations of the aircraft suggested the entire plane was on fire. Despite challenging emergency conditions, the pilots managed to land the aircraft but struck an obstacle, causing fatal injuries to two flight engineers.

== Aftermath ==
Measures were implemented to prevent similar accidents. All recognized causes were mitigated, with new methods adopted to improve fuel pipeline durability. Remedies were also found to prevent the hydraulic shocks. These issues were specific to the new elements in the RD-36-51A engine fuel system; the fuel system of the previous variant was found to be unaffected, and passed the tests unmodified.

The crash resulted in a ban on passenger flights of the Tu-144. Combined with other issues involving the Tu-144, including an earlier crash at the 1973 Paris Air Show and complaints about reliability and passenger comfort, this caused a lack of interest in the Tu-144, which ultimately led to the demise of the Tu-144 program.

== See also ==
- The only British-French Concorde crash - Air France Flight 4590
