= Tupolev Tu-98 =

Jet bomber in the USSR

Tu-98
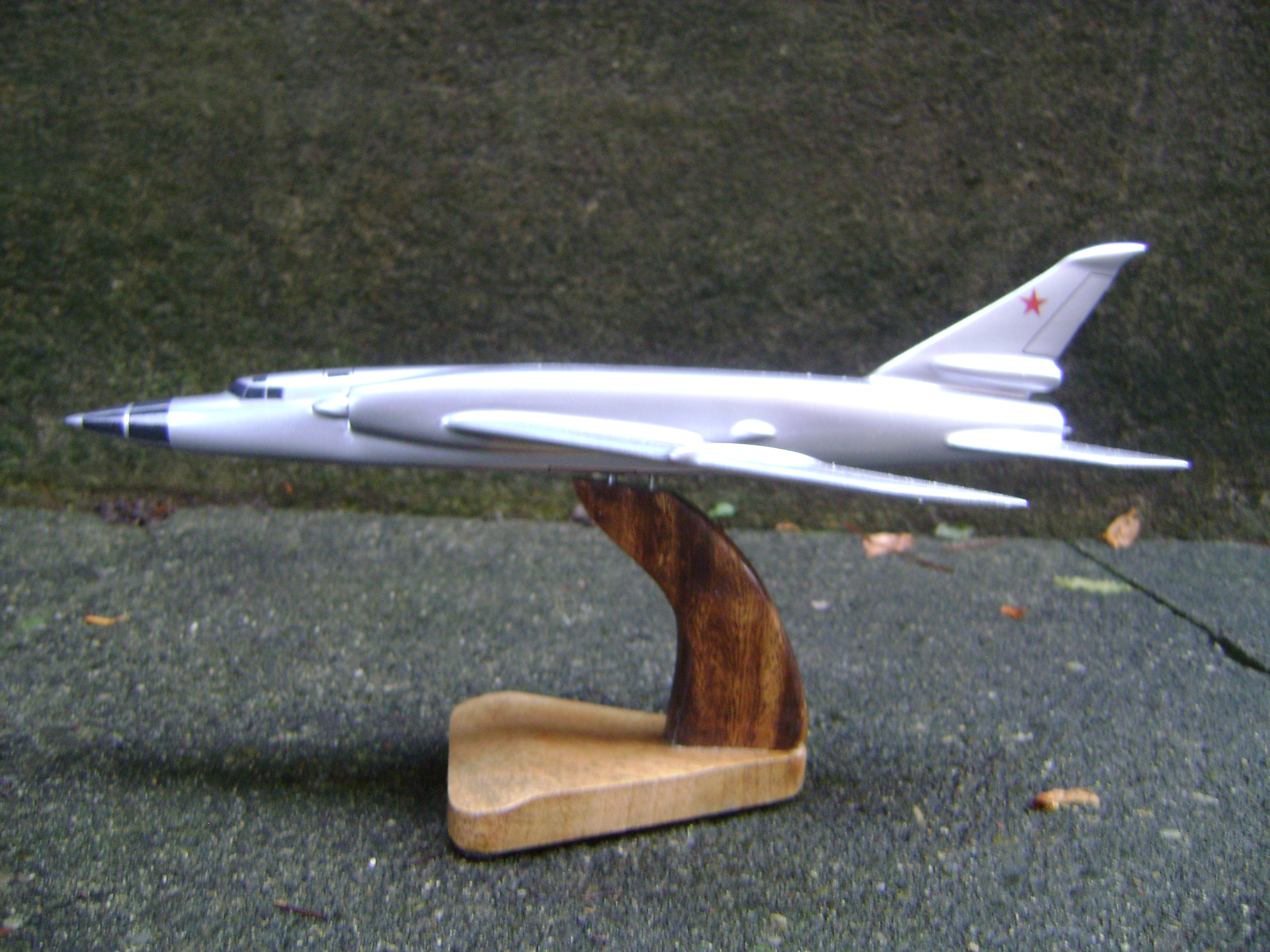
- Model of the Tu-98

General information
- Type: Bomber
- National origin: Soviet Union
- Manufacturer: Tupolev
- Number built: 1

History
- First flight: 1956

The Tupolev Tu-98 (NATO reporting name Backfin) was a prototype swept wing jet bomber developed by Tupolev for the Soviet Union.

== Development ==
The Tu-98 emerged from a program for a fast supersonic bomber to replace the Tupolev Tu-16. It was powered by two Lyulka AL-7 turbojet engines with side-mounted intakes high on the fuselage (above the wingroot). The Tu-98 was built in 1955 and first flown in 1956. It was shown to an American delegation at the Tushino airfield outside Moscow in June 1956, but it subsequently did not enter service, and only the single prototype was completed.

The basic design of the Tu-98 had a great influence on the subsequent prototype of the Tupolev Tu-28 interceptor, officially known as the Tu-128 (NATO codename 'Fiddler').

The Tu-98 was a supersonic bomber developed by OKB-156, designed as a replacement for the Tu-16. Work on the prototype began on the basis of the Resolution of the USSR Council of Ministers on April 12, 1954. The aircraft's chief designer was D. S. Markov.

The aircraft was built in 1955 and took to the air for the first time in 1956. Test flights continued until 1959. The Tu-98 did not pass any of the state tests nor did it enter into production due to numerous, unresolved manufacturing and technological difficulties. The aircraft was later used as a flying, supersonic research laboratory during the development of the Tu-128 interceptor.

The last flight was made on November 21, 1960, when the undercarriage collapsed. The prototype was subsequently written off.

The "98" was further developed into a lightweight version of the supersonic bomber called the "98A" (Tu-24).

The Tu-98 was shown to a US delegation under General Twining at the Kubinka military airfield near Moscow in June 1956 and presented by Soviet first secretary Nikita Khrushchev as the latest Soviet bomber development. The US military was impressed and, as no details were given about the aircraft, assigned the design to the Yakovlev design office. There were also speculations about an alleged series production, which was estimated at 15 pieces per year in 1958, which is why NATO gave the code name Backfin and the (fictitious) designation Yak-42. A commissioning was never planned for the Tu-98. The only prototype was flown only for test purposes and at the air parade in Tushino.

The design of the Tu-98 had a major impact on the prototype of the Tupolev Tu-28 interceptor, officially known as the Tu-128. In addition to aerodynamic tests for the Tu-128, the Tu-98 was used for tests with the future Tu-128 RP-7 "Smersch" radar, where the glazed bow was replaced by the device, and the "Kompleks 80" fire control system. The R-4 air-to-air missiles intended as armament for this type were also tested with the Tu-98. The official name of the machine for it was Tu-98LL for "letajuschtschaja laboratorija", flying laboratory. After these tests were completed, the Tu-98 was parked in Zhukovsky for a while before it was scrapped. The Tu-98 also provided information for the construction of the Tu-22.

== Design ==
The aircraft is built according to the scheme of a mid wing with a swept wing (the sweep angle on the leading edge is 55 degrees). Two AL-7F engines were installed in the stern, fed by long intake ducts and air inlets shifted upwards. The main landing gear was located in the fuselage, which made the wing “clean”, but led to a considerable reduction of stability on the ground. The crew consisted of a pilot - a ship commander, a navigator-operator and a navigator-navigator. All crew stations had ejection seats. The front of the aircraft was a single pressurized cabin. Behind the pressurized cabin there was a technical compartment with photographic equipment (AFA-33/75). The fuel system consisted of 4 main and one centering tanks in the fuselage. The wing was a two-spar, caisson design.

The control system was performed according to the traditional scheme - with a fixed stabilizer, although for the first time in all control channels, Andrey Nikolayevich agreed to use irreversible hydraulic boosters (his saying is known - “the best booster is the one that stands on the ground”). The front landing gear had a two-wheel axle, the main gear had two pairs of wheels.

For the first time in the domestic bomber, a remote-controlled aft-firing dual AM-23 gun DK-18 installation was used. The guns were aimed by the ARS-1 “Argon” radar sight, the antenna unit of which was placed in the upper part of vertical stabilizer. An additional AM-23 cannon was mounted in the forward right fuselage, which could be fired by the pilot.

The aircraft's missile and bomb armament included the OFAB-100-120, FAB-250 or FAB-500 dumb bombs in various combinations, as well as up to 300 NAR ARS-85, or 61 TRS-132, or 18 TRS-212. For naval aviation, the aircraft was to be armed with AMD-500 and AMD-100 mines, torpedoes RAT-52, MAN, MAV and TAN-53. The aircraft was equipped with the radar "Initiative" and collimator sights OPB-16.

== Specifications (Tu-98) ==
General characteristics

- Crew: 3
- Length: 32.06 m (105 ft 2 in)
- Wingspan: 17.27 m (56 ft 8 in)
- Height: 8.06 m (26 ft 5 in)
- Wing area: 87.5 m^{2} (942 sq ft)
- Max takeoff weight: 39,000 kg (85,980 lb)
- Powerplant: 2 × Lyulka AL-7F turbojet engines, 93.2 kN (21,000 lbf) thrust each

Performance

- Maximum speed: 1,365 km/h (848 mph, 737 kn)
- Range: 2,440 km (1,520 mi, 1,320 nmi)
- Service ceiling: 12,750 m (41,830 ft)
- Thrust/weight: 0.49

Armament

- Guns: 3 × 23 mm (0.906 in) Nudelman-Rikhter NR-23 cannon
- Bombs: 5,000 kg (11,023 lb)

== See also ==
Related development

- Tupolev Tu-22
- Tupolev Tu-28

Related lists

- List of bomber aircraft
- List of military aircraft of the Soviet Union and the CIS
