= AA5 =

AA-5 or AA5 may refer to:

- AA-5 Ash, NATO reporting name for the Bisnovat R-4 a Soviet long-range air-to-air missile
- Grumman American AA-5, an American light aircraft
- All American Five, a basic design for a mass-produced superheterodyne radio using five tubes
- Phoenix Wright: Ace Attorney – Dual Destinies, also referred to as Ace Attorney 5
- Hieroglyph for a part of steering gear of a ship (Gardiner's designated symbol AA5)
