= Tupolev Tu-28 =

Soviet interceptor aircraft

Tupolev Tu-28/Tu-128
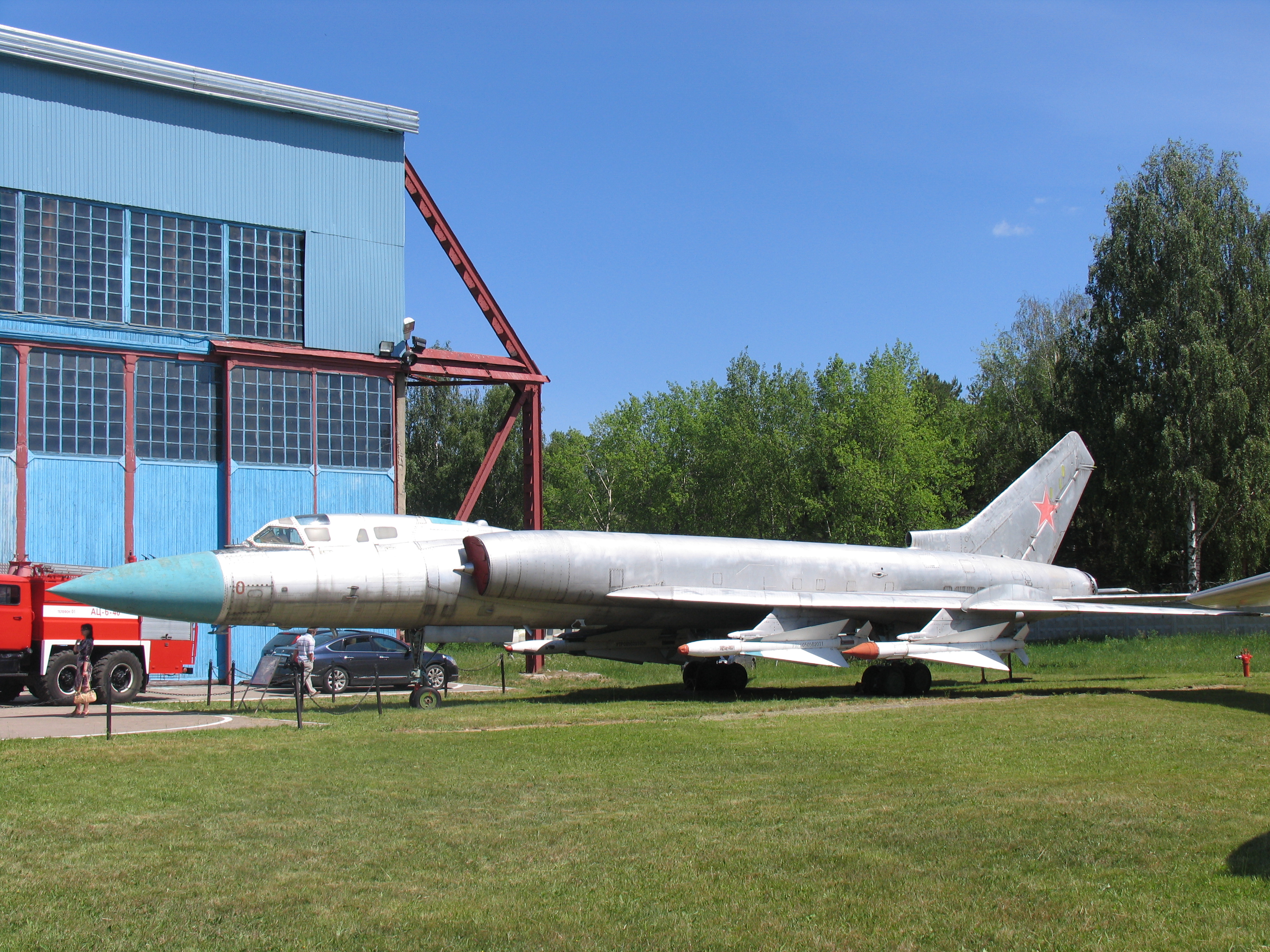
- Tu-128 at the Central Air Force Museum at Monino, Russia

General information
- Type: Interceptor
- Manufacturer: Voronezh Aircraft Production Association
- Designer: Tupolev
- Primary user: Soviet Air Defence Forces
- Number built: 198 (including 10 trainers)

History
- Introduction date: 1964 (or 1966)
- First flight: 18 March 1961
- Retired: 1990
- Developed from: Tupolev Tu-98

The Tupolev Tu-28 (NATO reporting name Fiddler) is a long-range interceptor aircraft introduced by the Soviet Union in the 1960s. The official designation was Tu-128, but this designation was less commonly used in the West. It was the largest and heaviest fighter (Note: Tu-128 was the largest fighter assuming that the definition of "fighter" includes an interceptor aircraft. Tu-128 was not intended for fighter-to-fighter combat (i.e. air superiority battle). For an even heavier interceptor design, which did not enter service, see Lockheed YF-12.) to ever enter serial production.

== Background ==
In the 1950s, the Soviet Union sought means to defend against nuclear-armed American bombers possibly penetrating its borders (especially its long and vulnerable northern border). Contemporary interceptors, such as the Yakovlev Yak-28P, were able to cover a radius of just a few hundred kilometers flying from northern Soviet bases like Talagi and Savatiya; the newly developed surface-to-air missiles had even shorter range. Considering both, the sheer numbers required to defend a 5,000 km air front (Note: The geographical distance between Murmansk and Anadyr is 4,911 km.) were economically impossible to maintain. This left the Soviet Union able to provide a modern air defense only for selected valuable areas. The PVO decided to cover the entire territory, but with a looser defence. In 1955 it placed a requirement for a large area-defense interceptor, that would achieve it with sparse (Note: For example, in 1972, a mere six air bases provided the sole interceptor cover for almost a half of the Soviet Union's interior. These bases employed most of the Tu-128 force.) airbases. The PVO requirement called for a supersonic aircraft with enormous fuel tanks for both a good patrol time and long range, a capable radar, and the most powerful air-to-air missiles possible. The first attempt, although unsuccessful, was the Lavochkin La-250, a 30-tonne interceptor prototype which was the last of the Lavochkin design bureau's aircraft.

== Design and development ==
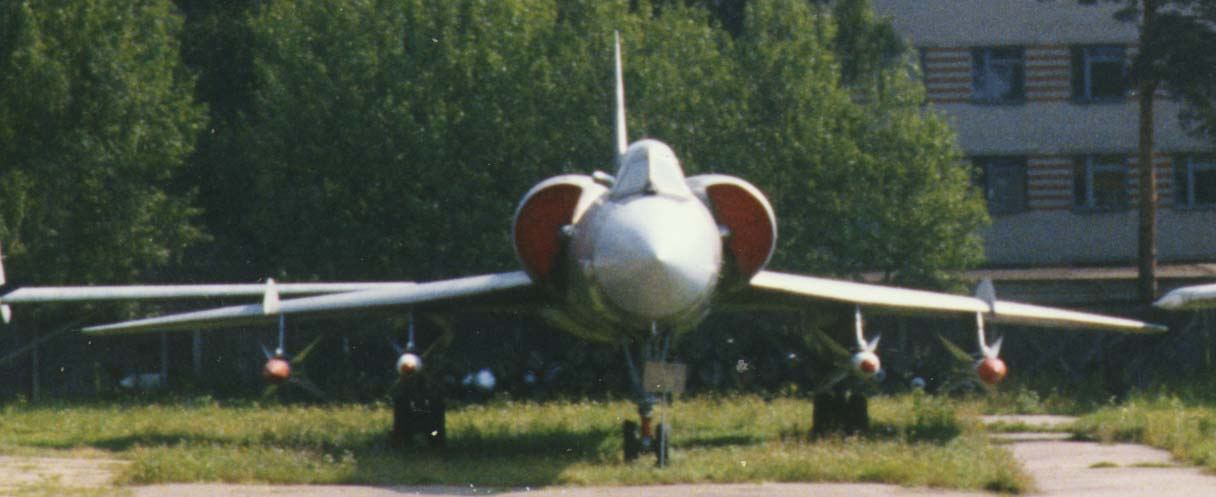
Tu-128 prototype at Central Air Force Museum, Monino, Russia

Iosif Nezval of Tupolev Design Bureau led development of the new interceptor aircraft. The work began in 1958, based on an existing single prototype of the unsuccessful Tu-98 supersonic bomber. The military designation of the interceptor was at first Tu-28, but it was changed in 1963 to Tu-128, identical to the designation used by the OKB.

The Tu-128 had a broad, low/mid-mounted swept wing carrying the main landing gear in wing-mounted pods, and slab tailplanes. Two Lyulka AL-7F-2 turbojet engines were mounted in the fuselage. The two-man crew of pilot and navigator were seated in tandem.

The Tu-128, with its maximum weight of 43 tonnes, was the heaviest fighter to enter service. A pure interceptor with high wing loading, unsophisticated but reliable avionics, and poor visibility, it was not an agile aircraft and was intended only to engage NATO bombers like the B-52, not dogfight smaller aircraft.

The interceptor made its initial public appearance in the 1961 Tushino air parade. Western experts, unaware that the bulge on the belly carried testing instruments, mistook it for a large ventral radar for a mixed interceptor/AWACS role. The production version lacked the bulge and had a large nose radome housing a radar, known as RP-S (Note: Some sources provide the radar's designation as RP-5 instead of RP-S, possibly a mistake.) Smerch, having a detection range of about 50 km (31 mi) and a lock-on range of about 40 km (25 mi).

Armament of the Tu-128 was four Bisnovat R-4 air-to-air missiles (known as K-80 during development; NATO reporting name AA-5 'Ash'). Usually two of them were R-4Rs with semi-active radar homing and two were R-4T infrared-homing missiles, with the former on the outer pylons and the latter on the inner underwing pylons. There was no internal weapons bay.

Production of the Tu-128 ended in 1970 with a total of 198 aircraft having been built.

Development of various projects designated Tu-28A, Tu-28-80, Tu-28-100, Tu-138, and Tu-148 were proposed by the Tupolev Design Bureau but all were abandoned.

== Operational history ==
The Tu-128's only publicly reported combat operation was the destruction of NATO reconnaissance balloons. The aircraft remained in service until 1990. Through the 1980s, units armed with the Tu-128 converted to the Mikoyan MiG-31, which features more advanced sensors and weapons.

== Variants ==
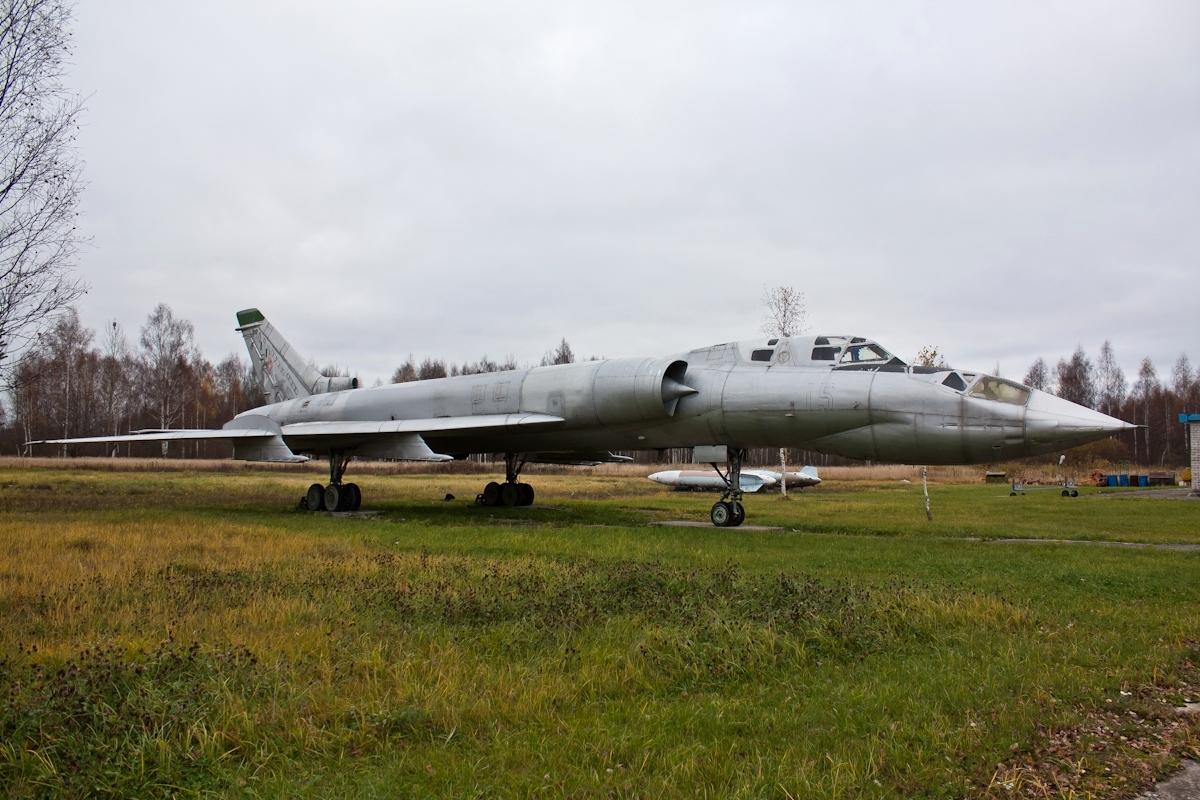
Tupolev Tu-128UT

Prototype of Tu-28 ('Fiddler-A')
Development test aircraft, one built. OKB designation was 128. In the West, Fiddler-A was used for all the aircraft with twin ventral fins — these included a prototype and a few of initial production (perhaps two planes).
Tu-128 (also known as Tu-28; 'Fiddler-B')
Main version, first deployed operationally in 1964 (or 1966 – sources differ). The military designation was at first Tu-28, but the existing aircraft were renamed in 1963. The entire weapon complex (aircraft, radar, missiles) was designated Tu-128S-4. In the Western sources, but not in Soviet, often the more precise, but erroneous, designation of this version is mentioned as either Tu-28P or Tu-128P.
Tu-128UT (also known as Tu-28UT)
Training version with an additional cockpit forward of the normal one, in place of a radar. Ten built and four converted from standard interceptors.
Tu-128M
A 1979 modernization of almost all existing aircraft for better interception at low altitude. Development originated in 1970. Engines and airframe were not altered. The full designation of the entire weapons complex was Tu-128S-4M. It contained a new RP-SM Smerch-M radar, and new missile set: R-4RM plus R-4TM.

=== Abandoned ===
Tu-28A
New development, abandoned.
Tu-28-80
Development designation, abandoned.
Tu-28-100
Development designation, abandoned.
Tu-138
New development, abandoned.
Tu-148
New development, variable geometry wings, abandoned.

== Operators ==
Soviet Union

- Soviet Air Defence Forces

== Specifications (Tu-128) ==
Tupolev Tu-128 3-view drawing

Data from Tupolev: The Man and His Aircraft

General characteristics

- Crew: 2
- Length: 30.06 m (98 ft 7 in)
- Wingspan: 17.53 m (57 ft 6 in)
- Height: 7.15 m (23 ft 5 in)
- Wing area: 96.94 m^{2} (1,043.5 sq ft)
- Empty weight: 24,500 kg (54,013 lb)
- Gross weight: 40,000 kg (88,185 lb)
- Max takeoff weight: 43,000–43,700 kg (94,799–96,342 lb)
- Fuel capacity: 13,600 kg (29,983 lb) maximum (estimated)
- Powerplant: 2 × Lyulka AL-7F-2 afterburning turbojet engines, 72.8 kN (16,400 lbf) thrust each dry, 99.1 kN (22,300 lbf) with afterburner

Performance

- Maximum speed: 1,665 km/h (1,035 mph, 899 kn) / M1.5 armed

1,929 km/h (1,199 mph; 1,042 kn) un-armed

- Range: 2,565 km (1,594 mi, 1,385 nmi)
- Endurance: >3 hours
- Service ceiling: 15,600 m (51,200 ft)
- Absolute ceiling: 20,000 m (66,000 ft)
- g limits: +2.5

Armament

- Hardpoints: 4
- Missiles: 4 × Bisnovat R-4 air-to-air missiles (usually 2 × radar-guided R-4R and 2 × infrared-homing R-4T); other armament or tanks not used

== See also ==
- North American A-5 Vigilante
- Boeing B-47 Stratojet
- Boeing B-52 Stratofortress
- Convair B-58 Hustler

Related development

- Tupolev Tu-98
- Tupolev Tu-22

Aircraft of comparable role, configuration, and era

- Yakovlev Yak-28
- Sukhoi Su-15
- Avro CF-105 Arrow
- Convair F-106 Delta Dart
- Lavochkin La-250
- McDonnell F-101B Voodoo
- North American XF-108 Rapier

Related lists

- List of fighter aircraft
- List of military aircraft of the Soviet Union and the CIS
