= Dobrynin RD-7 =

Turbojet aircraft engine

RD-7
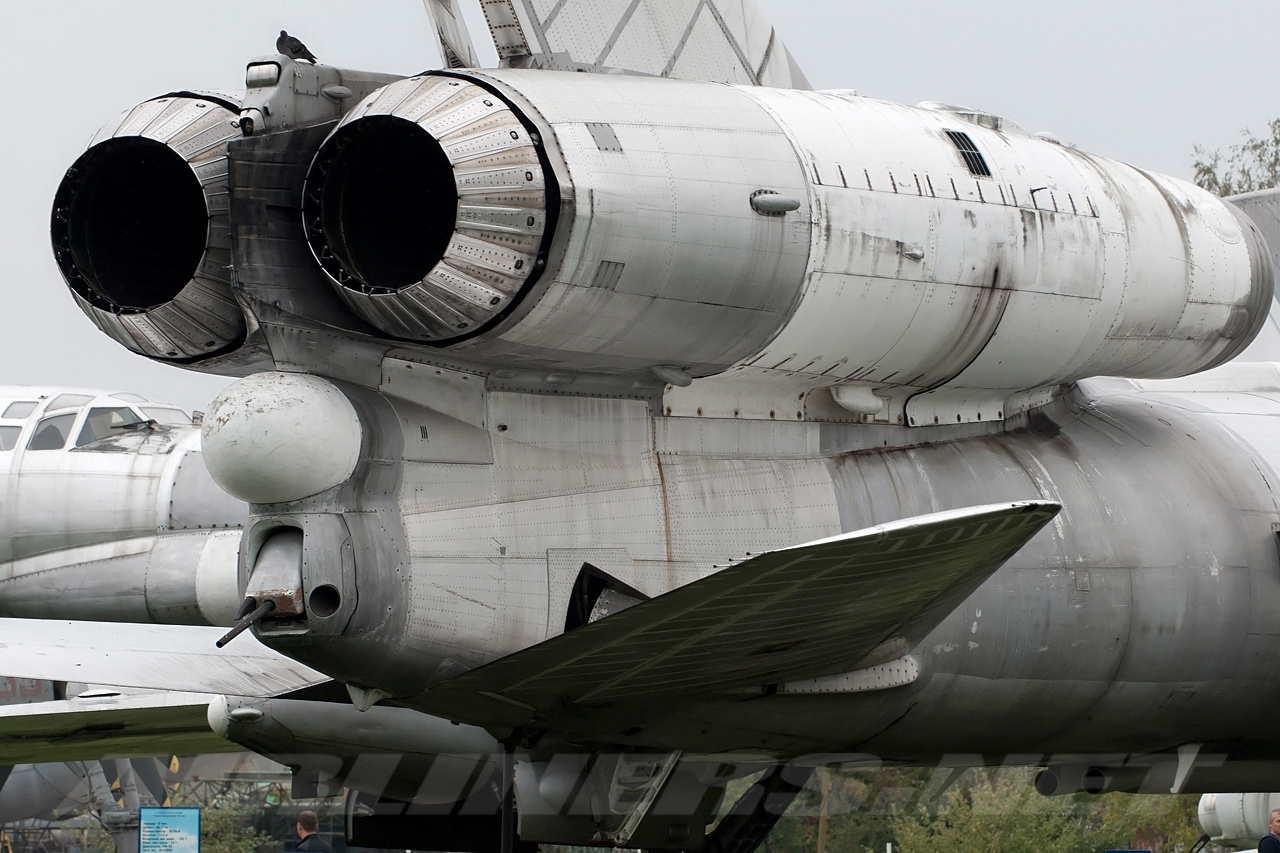
- Tupolev Tu-22 with RD-7 engines
- Type: Turbojet
- National origin: Soviet Union
- Manufacturer: Rybinsk Plant No. 36
- Designer: Dobrynin OKB
- Major applications: Tupolev Tu-22; Myasishchev M-50; Caspian Sea Monster
- Manufactured: 1952–1956

The Dobrynin RD-7 or "VD-7" is a Soviet single-shaft axial-flow turbojet engine, which was produced in a small series. "RD" means реактивный двигатель (jet engine). Designed by designer Vladimir Alekseevich Dobrynin (the original designation is VD-7), it was intended for installation on the Myasishchev Type 103 strategic bomber (M-4, later 3M).

== Variants ==
- VD-7B:
- VD-7P:
- RD-7M:
- RD-7M-2:
- VD-7MD:

== Applications ==
- Tupolev Tu-22
- Myasishchev M-50
- Myasishchev VM-T
- Caspian Sea Monster

== Specifications (VD-7M) ==
==== General characteristics ====
- Type: Single-shaft turbojet
- Length: 7,300 mm (290 in)
- Diameter: 1,410 mm (56 in)
- Dry weight: 3,750 kg (8,270 lb)

==== Components ====
- Compressor: Axial flow, 9-stage LP, 7-stage HP
- Turbine: Axial, 2-stage

==== Performance ====
- Maximum thrust: Dry: 103 kN (10 500 kgf), 157 kN (16000 kgf) with afterburner, 107/110 kN and 161/165 afterburner for later variants
- Overall pressure ratio: 11
- Turbine inlet temperature: 630°C
- Thrust-to-weight ratio: 4.27

== See also ==
Related lists

- List of aircraft engines
