= Savatiya (air base) =

Airport in Russia

Savatiya Savatiya-Kotlas
- Kotlas, Arkhangelsk Oblast in Russia
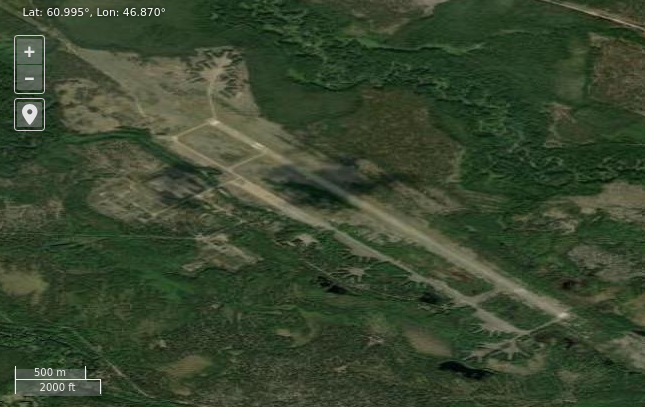
- Satellite imagery of former Savatiya air base

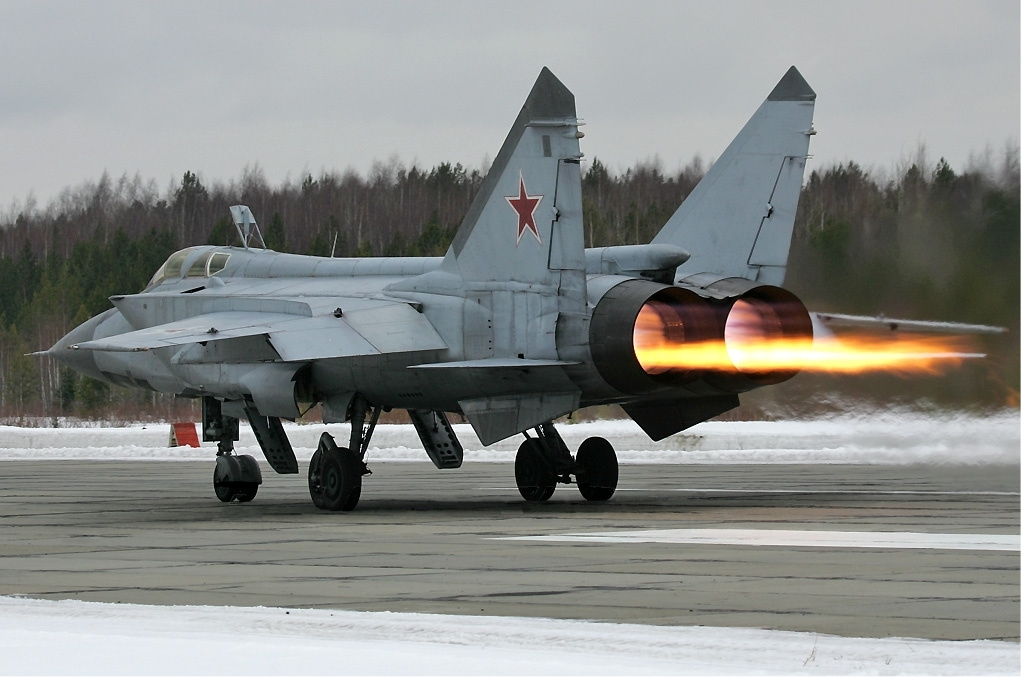

Site information
- Type: Air Base
- Owner: Ministry of Defence
- Operator: Russian Air Force

Location
- Shown within Arkhangelsk Oblast Savatiya (Russia)
- Coordinates: 60°59′42″N 46°52′12″E

Site history
- Built: 1967
- In use: 1967 - 2010

Airfield information
- Identifiers: ICAO: ULKS
- Elevation: 97 metres (318 ft) AMSL
Runways
Direction	Length and surface
12/30	2,500 metres (8,202 ft) Concrete

Savatiya (also Kotlas South, Savati, or Savvatiya) (ICAO: ULKS) is a former Russian Air Force air base in Arkhangelsk Oblast, Russia located 29 km south of Kotlas. It is a small interceptor airfield. It was home to 445th Interceptor Aviation Regiment (445 IAP) between 1967 and 1993, which received Tupolev Tu-128 (ASCC: Fiddler) aircraft in 1967, Mikoyan-Gurevich MiG-25 (ASCC: Foxbat) aircraft by the late 1970s, and Mikoyan MiG-31 (ASCC: Foxhound) by the 1990s. It is also listed as being home to 458th Guards Interceptor Aviation Regiment (458 IAP) which flew MiG-31s in the 1990s.

The base was also used by the 470th Guards Fighter Aviation Regiment from 1993.

== See also ==
- List of military airbases in Russia
