= Lavochkin La-250 =

Soviet Interceptor Aircraft

La-250
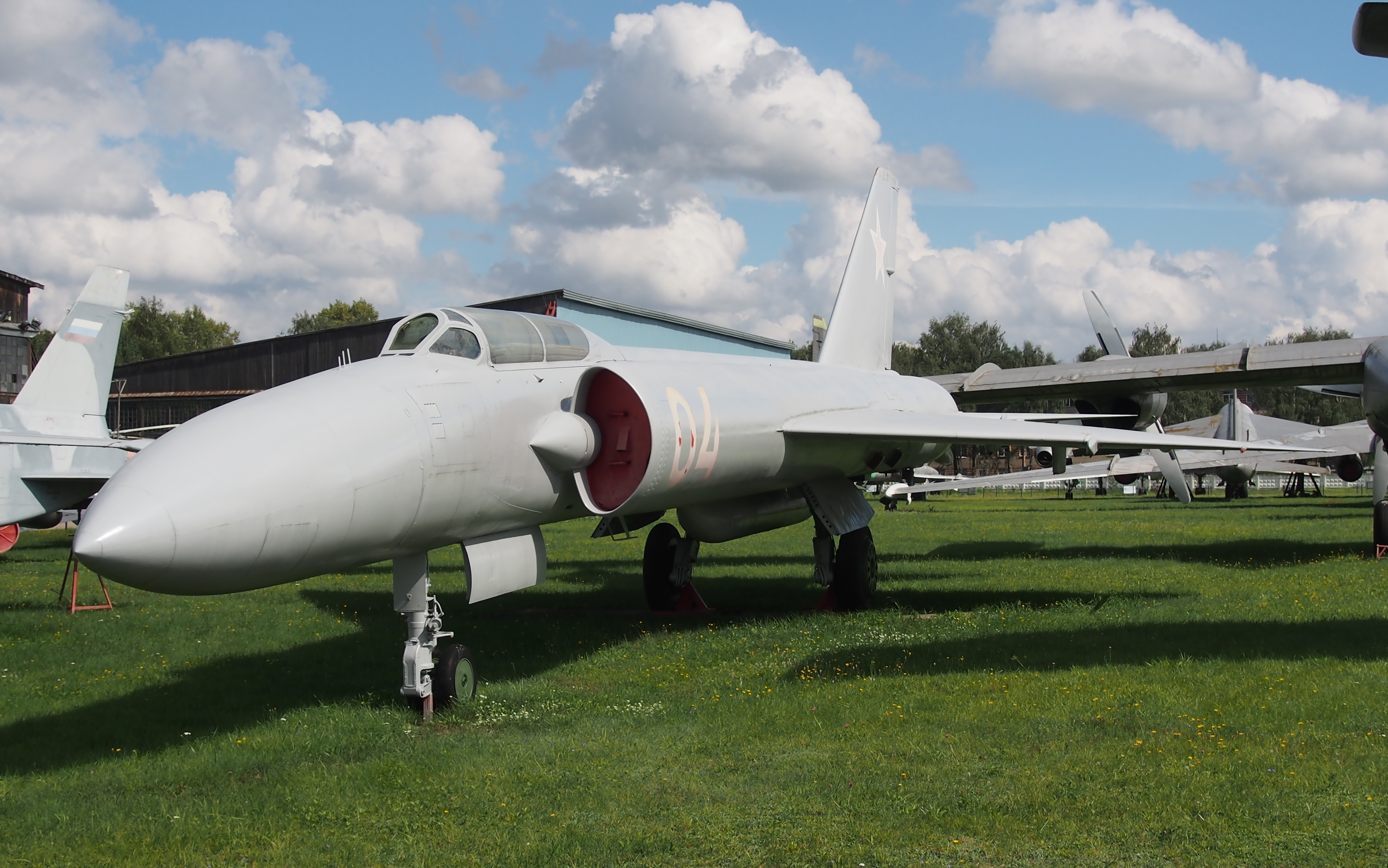
- La-250A at Central Air Force Museum at Monino

General information
- Type: Interceptor
- Manufacturer: Lavochkin
- Status: Cancelled 1959
- Primary user: Soviet Air Forces
- Number built: 5

History
- First flight: 16 July 1956

The Lavochkin La-250 "Anakonda" was a high-altitude interceptor aircraft prototype developed in the Soviet Union by the Lavochkin design bureau in the 1950s. Its nickname "Anaconda" was invented during the flight test and referred to both the elongated body shape as well as the relatively critical flight characteristics of the machine.

== Development ==
By the mid-1950s, it became obvious that subsonic cannon-armed fighters such as the Yakovlev Yak-25 would be unable to intercept fast high-altitude targets like the upcoming generation of strategic jet bombers. Consequently, in 1953 Lavochkin OKB proposed addition of an air-to-air missile system to the Berkut air-defense system. Tasked with defense of Moscow, the Berkut system consisted of a large network of radars and surface-to-air missile sites as well as ground-controlled interceptor aircraft. Lavochkin's proposed missile, the G-300 utilized a guidance system based on vacuum tubes and was so heavy (about 1,000 kg (2,200 lb)) that no fighter in the Soviet arsenal could carry it. Instead, a Tupolev Tu-4 bomber (Soviet version of the Boeing B-29 Superfortress) was modified to carry four G-300s under the wings, with the whole system receiving designation G-310. For all this trouble, G-300 was expected to have a range of only 15 kilometres (9.3 mi) and a ceiling of 20,000 metres (66,000 ft). Although G-310 made ten flights in 1952, the system was abandoned as impractical.

In November 1952, the Soviet government ordered development of Kompleks K-15 (Complex K-15, a notion analogous to USAF's "weapon system" concept). K-15 was to consist of an "interceptor 250" (later designated La-250) carrying "Type 275" guided missiles. La-250 had to be able to intercept targets flying at 1,250 km/h (780 mph), Mach 1.18) at 20,000 metres (66,000 ft) up to 500 kilometres (310 mi) from the airbase. Initial guidance was to be from Vozdukh-1 ground control with terminal onboard radar guidance for the last 40 kilometres (25 mi) and automatic missile firing by the fire control system when in range. Missile "275" was projected to weigh 870 kilograms (1,920 lb) and, powered by a liquid fuel rocket motor, its top speed was to exceed 3,900 km/h (2,400 mph). With a 125 kilograms (276 lb) conventional warhead, it had a projected lethal radius of 50 metres (160 ft). La-250 was to carry two "275" missiles semi-recessed into the underside of the fuselage in a tandem arrangement.

The first flight took place on 16 July 1956 by Andrei G. Kochetkov. Problems with the K-15U radar and Klimov VK-9 engines forced a radical redesign of the aircraft to use the K-15M radar and, more importantly, much less powerful Lyulka AL-7F engines. This, in turn, led to the need to change "275" missiles to the lighter "275A" (although total missile weight decreased to 800 kilograms (1,800 lb), the warhead actually grew to 140 kilograms (310 lb)). The new airframe with a smaller fuselage and a delta wing instead of the earlier swept wing was designated La-250A. The "275" missiles were now carried on underwing pylons. The lighter airframe was not enough to overcome the weaker engines, and projected performance suffered compared to La-250. While busy redesigning the aircraft, Lavochkin OKB also had to develop new variants of the "275" missile - the semi-active radar homing "277," the nuclear-armed "279," and solid fuel rocket-powered "280." The first La-250A prototype was finally rolled out on 16 June 1956.

Test flights of the five prototypes were plagued by crashes caused by failures of the hydraulic boost system and landing gear as well as poor forward visibility (the latter was corrected with fitting of a new slightly "drooped" nose). La-250A made a single test flight in 1956, only 6 flights in 1957, and a mere 14 flights in 1958. Frustrated by the lack of progress, Soviet Air Force stopped all work on the K-15 system in 1959. Lessons learned with K-15 were used to develop new interceptor system requirements which led to the Tupolev Tu-28 interceptor.

== Surviving aircraft ==
One of Lavochkin La-250A prototypes is on display at the Central Air Force Museum at Monino, outside of Moscow, Russia.

== Specifications (La-250A) ==
La-250

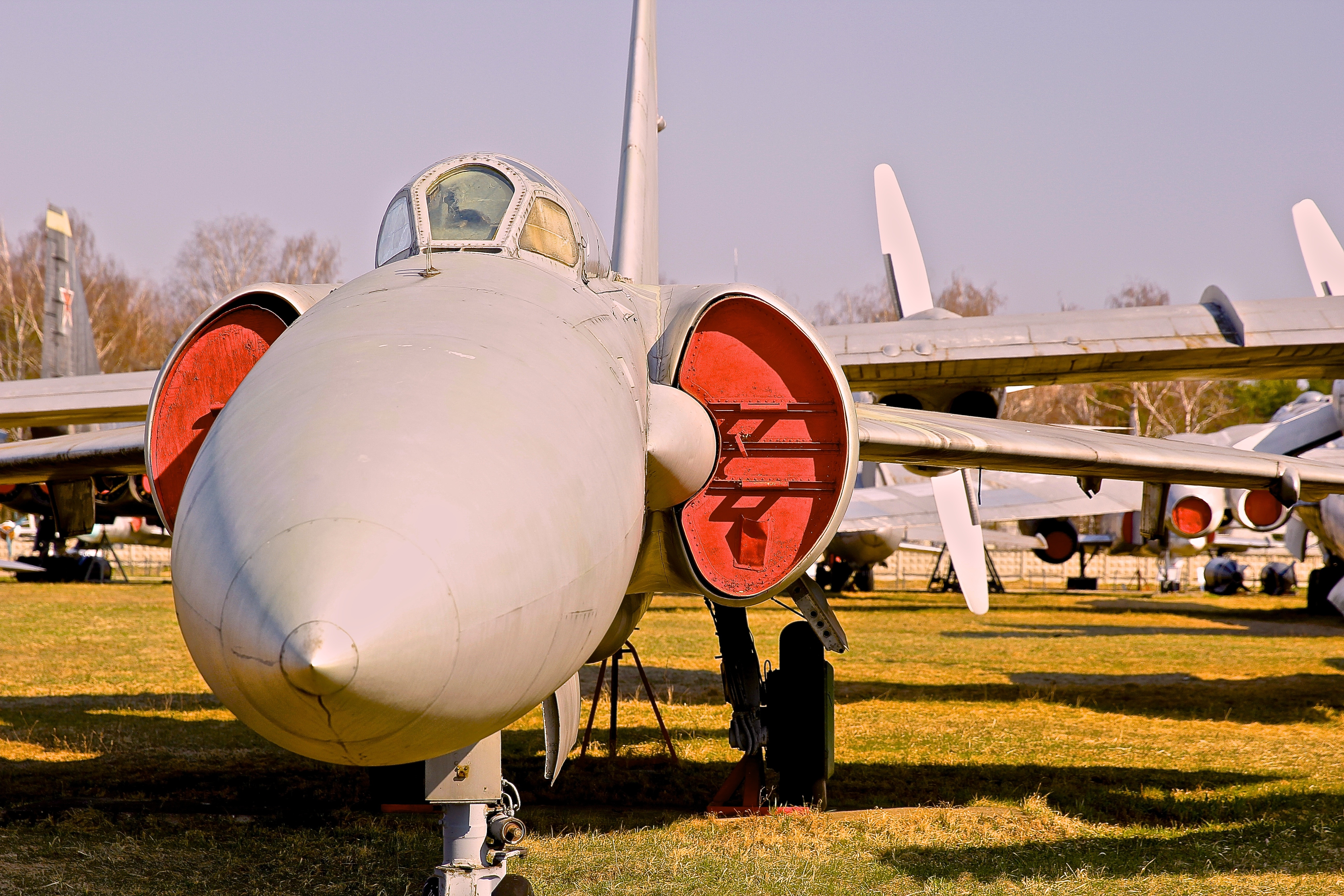
La-250 in Monino. Notice separation of inlet from body for better airflow at supersonic speeds

Data from

General characteristics

- Crew: 2
- Length: 26.8 m (87 ft 11 in)
- Wingspan: 13.9 m (45 ft 7 in)
- Height: 6.5 m (21 ft 4 in)
- Wing area: 79.916 m^{2} (860.21 sq ft)
- Empty weight: 18,989 kg (41,864 lb)
- Gross weight: 24,500 kg (54,013 lb)
- Max takeoff weight: 27,500 kg (60,627 lb)
- Fuel capacity: 8,700 kg (19,180 lb) internal; 9,700 kg (21,385 lb) with 1,350 L (360 US gal; 300 imp gal) drop tank
- Powerplant: 2 × Lyulka AL-7F-1 afterburning turbojet engines, 73.55 kN (16,535 lbf) thrust each dry, 98.06 kN (22,045 lbf) with afterburner

Performance

- Maximum speed: 1,700–1,800 km/h (1,100–1,100 mph, 920–970 kn) clean

1,600 km/h (990 mph; 860 kn) at 12,000 m (39,000 ft) with missiles fitted

- Landing speed: 225 km/h (140 mph; 121 kn) at 12,000 m (39,000 ft) and 1,000 km/h (620 mph; 540 kn)
- On-station loiter: 2 hours 18 minutes
- Range: 2,000 km (1,200 mi, 1,100 nmi)
- Service ceiling: 17,000 m (56,000 ft)
- Time to altitude: 12,000 m (39,000 ft) 2 minutes 50 seconds
- Wing loading: 306 kg/m^{2} (63 lb/sq ft)

Armament

- Missiles: 2 × Air-to-air missiles on underwing pylons, either "275," "277," "279," or "280." (see text for description)

Avionics
K-15 weapon system

== See also ==
Related development

- Tupolev Tu-28

Aircraft of comparable role, configuration, and era

- F-101 Voodoo
- F-106 Delta Dart

Related lists

- List of fighter aircraft
- List of military aircraft of the Soviet Union and the CIS

== Sources ==
- Kopenhagen, W (ed.), Das große Flugzeug-Typenbuch, Transpress, 1987, ISBN 3-344-00162-0
- Ла-250 Анаконда – Уголок неба. 2008
