= List of airliners by maximum takeoff weight =

This is a list of aircraft sorted by maximum takeoff weight.

== Airplanes ==
MTOW = Maximum take-off weight, MLW = Maximum landing weight, TOR = Take-off run (SL, ISA+15°, MTOW), LR = Landing run (SL, ISA+15°, MLW)

| Type | MTOW [kg] | MLW [tonnes] | TOR [m] | LR [m] | ICAO category | FAA category |
|---|---|---|---|---|---|---|
| Antonov An-225 (prior to destruction) | 640,000 | 591.7 | 3,500 | | Heavy | Super |
| Scaled Composites Model 351 Stratolaunch | 589,670 | | 3,660 | | Heavy | Heavy |
| Airbus A380-800 | 575,000 | 394 | 3,100 | 1,930 | Super | Super |
| Boeing 747-8F | 447,700 | 346.091 | 3,100 | 1,800 | Heavy | Heavy |
| Boeing 747-8 | 443,613 | 306.175 | 3,100 | | Heavy | Heavy |
| Boeing 747-400ER | 412,770 | 295.742 | 3,090 | | Heavy | Heavy |
| Antonov An-124-100M | 405,060 | 330 | 2,520 | 900 | Heavy | Heavy |
| Boeing 747-400 | 396,900 | 295.742 | 3,018 | 2,179 | Heavy | Heavy |
| Lockheed C-5 Galaxy | 381,000 | 288.417 | 2,530 | 1,494 | Heavy | Heavy |
| Boeing 747-200 | 377,840 | 285.7 | 3,338 | 2,109 | Heavy | Heavy |
| Boeing 747-300 | 377,840 | 260.32 | 3,222 | 1,905 | Heavy | Heavy |
| Airbus A340-500 | 371,950 | 240 | 3,050 | 2,010 | Heavy | Heavy |
| Airbus A340-600 | 368,000 | 256 | 3,100 | 2,100 | Heavy | Heavy |
| Boeing 777F | 347,800 | 260.816 | 2,830 | | Heavy | Heavy |
| Boeing 777-300ER | 351,800 | 251.29 | 3,100 | | Heavy | Heavy |
| Boeing 777-200LR | 347,450 | 223.168 | 3,000 | | Heavy | Heavy |
| Boeing 747-100 | 340,200 | 265.3 | | | Heavy | Heavy |
| Airbus A350-1000 | 315,000 | 233.5 | | | Heavy | Heavy |
| Boeing 777-300 | 299,370 | 237.683 | 3,380 | | Heavy | Heavy |
| Boeing 777-200ER | 297,550 | 213 | 3,380 | 1,550 | Heavy | Heavy |
| Airbus A340-300 | 257,000 | 190 | 3,000 | 1,926 | Heavy | Heavy |
| McDonnell Douglas MD-11 | 273,300 | 185 | 2,990 | 1,890 | Heavy | Heavy |
| Airbus A350-900 | 270,000 | 175 | 2,670 | 1,860 | Heavy | Heavy |
| Ilyushin Il-96M | 270,000 | 195.04 | 3,115 | 2,118 | Heavy | Heavy |
| McDonnell Douglas DC-10 | 256,280 | 183 | 2,990 | 1,890 | Heavy | Heavy |
| Boeing 787-9 | 254,000 | 192.777 | 2,900 | | Heavy | Heavy |
| Boeing 787-10 | 254,000 | 201.849 | | | Heavy | Heavy |
| Airbus A340-200 | 253,500 | 181 | 2,990 | | Heavy | Heavy |
| Airbus A330-900 | 251,000 | 191 | 3,100 | | Heavy | Heavy |
| Ilyushin IL-96-300 | 250,000 | 175 | 2,600 | 1,980 | Heavy | Heavy |
| Airbus A330-300 | 233,000 | 185 | 2,500 | 1,750 | Heavy | Heavy |
| Airbus A330-200 | 242,000 | 180 | 2,220 | 1,750 | Heavy | Heavy |
| Lockheed L-1011-500 | 231,300 | 166.92 | 2,636 | | Heavy | Heavy |
| Boeing 787-8 | 228,000 | 172.365 | 3,300 | 1,695 | Heavy | Heavy |
| Lockheed L-1011-200 | 211,400 | | | | Heavy | Heavy |
| Ilyushin IL-86 | 208,000 | 175 | | | Heavy | Heavy |
| Boeing 767-400ER | 204,000 | 158.758 | 3,414 | | Heavy | Heavy |
| Airbus A300-600R | 192,000 | 140 | 2,385 | 1,555 | Heavy | Heavy |
| Boeing 767-300ER | 187,000 | 136.08 | 2,713 | 1,676 | Heavy | Heavy |
| Concorde | 185,000 | 111.1 | 3,440 | 2,220 | Heavy | Heavy |
| Airbus A300-600 | 163,000 | 138 | 2,324 | 1,536 | Heavy | Heavy |
| Boeing 767-300 | 159,000 | 136.078 | 2,713 | 1,676 | Heavy | Heavy |
| Airbus A310-300 | 157,000 | 124 | 2,290 | 1,490 | Heavy | Heavy |
| Vickers VC10 | 152,000 | 151.9 | | | Heavy | Heavy |
| Boeing 707-320B | 151,000 | 97.5 | | | Heavy | Heavy |
| Boeing 707-320C | 151,000 | 112.1 | | | Heavy | Heavy |
| Douglas DC-8-61 | 147,000 | | | | Heavy | Heavy |
| Airbus A310-200 | 142,000 | 123 | 1,860 | 1,480 | Heavy | Heavy |
| Airbus A400M | 141,000 | 122 | 980 | 770 | Heavy | Heavy |
| Douglas DC-8-32 | 140,000 | | | | Heavy | Heavy |
| Douglas DC-8-51 | 125,000 | | | | Medium | Large |
| Boeing 757-300 | 124,000 | 101.6 | 2,550 | 1,750 | Medium | Large |
| Boeing 707-120B | 117,000 | 86.3 | | | Medium | Large |
| Boeing 757-200 | 116,000 | 89.9 | 2,347 | 1,555 | Medium | Large |
| Boeing 720B | 106,000 | 79.5 | | | Medium | Large |
| Boeing 720 | 104,000 | 79.5 | | | Medium | Large |
| Tupolev Tu-154M | 104,000 | 80 | | | Medium | Large |
| Tupolev Tu-204SM | 104,000 | 87.5 | 2,250 | | Medium | Large |
| Convair 880 | 87,500 | | | | Medium | Large |
| Boeing 737-900 | 85,000 | 66.36 | 2,500 | 1,704 | Medium | Large |
| Boeing 737-900ER | 85,000 | 71.35 | 2,804 | 1,829 | Medium | Large |
| Boeing 727-200 Advanced | 84,000 | 70.1 | | | Medium | Large |
| Airbus A321-100 | 83,000 | 77.8 | 2,200 | 1,540 | Medium | Large |
| Boeing 737-800 | 79,000 | 65.32 | 2,308 | 1,634 | Medium | Large |
| Boeing 727-200 | 78,000 | 68.1 | | | Medium | Large |
| McDonnell-Douglas MD-83 | 73,000 | 63.28 | | | Medium | Large |
| Boeing 727-100 | 72,500 | 62.4 | | | Medium | Large |
| Boeing 727-100C | 72,500 | 62.4 | | | Medium | Large |
| McDonnell-Douglas MD-90-30 | 71,000 | 64.41 | 2,165 | 1,520 | Medium | Large |
| de Havilland Comet 4 | 70,700 | | | | Medium | Large |
| Boeing 737-700 | 70,000 | 58.06 | 1,921 | 1,415 | Medium | Large |
| Airbus A320-100 | 68,000 | 66 | 1,955 | 1,490 | Medium | Large |
| Boeing 737-400 | 68,000 | 54.9 | 2,540 | 1,540 | Medium | Large |
| de Havilland Comet 3 | 68,000 | | | | Medium | Large |
| Boeing 377 | 67,000 | | | | Medium | Large |
| Boeing 737-600 | 66,000 | 54.66 | 1,796 | 1,340 | Medium | Large |
| Airbus A220-300 | 65,000 | 57.61 | 1,890 | 1,494 | Medium | Large |
| Hawker Siddeley Trident 2E | 65,000 | | | | Medium | Large |
| Airbus A319 | 64,000 | 62.5 | 1,850 | 1,470 | Medium | Large |
| Boeing 737-300 | 63,000 | 51.7 | 1,939 | 1,396 | Medium | Large |
| Boeing 737-500 | 60,000 | 49.9 | 1,832 | 1,360 | Medium | Large |
| Airbus A220-100 | 59,000 | 50.8 | 1,463 | 1,356 | Medium | Large |
| Airbus A318 | 59,000 | 57.5 | 1,375 | 1,340 | Medium | Large |
| Boeing 717-200HGW | 55,000 | 47.174 | 1,950 | | Medium | Large |
| Douglas DC-7 | 55,000 | | | | Medium | Large |
| de Havilland Comet 2 | 54,000 | | | | Medium | Large |
| Boeing 717-200BGW | 50,000 | 46.265 | 1,950 | | Medium | Large |
| de Havilland Comet 1 | 50,000 | | | | Medium | Large |
| Douglas DC-6A | 48,600 | | | | Medium | Large |
| Douglas DC-6B | 48,500 | | | | Medium | Large |
| Embraer 190 | 48,000 | 43 | 2,056 | 1,323 | Medium | Large |
| Caravelle III | 46,000 | | | | Medium | Large |
| Fokker 100 | 46,000 | 39.95 | 1,621 | 1,350 | Medium | Large |
| Douglas DC-6 | 44,000 | | | | Medium | Large |
| Avro RJ-85 | 42,000 | 36.74 | | | Medium | Large |
| Handley Page Hermes | 39,000 | | | | Medium | Large |
| Embraer 175 | 37,500 | 32.8 | 2,244 | 1,304 | Medium | Large |
| Bombardier CRJ900 | 36,500 | 33.345 | 1,778 | 1,596 | Medium | Large |
| Embraer 170 | 36,000 | 32.8 | 1,644 | 1,274 | Medium | Large |
| Bombardier CRJ700 | 33,000 | 30.39 | 1,564 | 1,478 | Medium | Large |
| Douglas DC-4 | 33,000 | | | | Medium | Large |
| Vickers Viscount 800 | 30,400 | | | | Medium | Large |
| Bombardier Q400 | 28,000 | 28.01 | 1,219 | 1,295 | Medium | Large |
| Bombardier CRJ200 | 23,000 | 21.319 | 1,918 | 1,479 | Medium | Large |
| ATR 72-600 | 22,800 | 22.35 | 1,333 | 914 | Medium | Large |
| Saab 2000 | 22,800 | 21.5 | 1,300 | | Medium | Large |
| Embraer ERJ 145 | 22,000 | 19.3 | 2,270 | 1,380 | Medium | Large |
| ATR 42-500 | 18,600 | 18.3 | 1,165 | 1,126 | Medium | Small |
| Saab 340 | 13,150 | 12.930 | 1,300 | 1,030 | Medium | Small |
| Embraer 120 Brasilia | 11,500 | 11.25 | 1,560 | 1,380 | Medium | Small |
| BAe Jetstream 41 | 10,890 | 10.57 | 1,493 | 826 | Medium | Small |
| Learjet 75 | 9,752 | 8.709 | 1,353 | 811 | Medium | Small |
| Pilatus PC-24 | 8,300 | 7.665 | 893 | 724 | Medium | Small |
| Embraer Phenom 300 | 8,150 | 7.65 | 956 | 677 | Medium | Small |
| Beechcraft 1900D | 7,765 | 7.605 | 1,036 | 853 | Medium | Small |
| Cessna Citation CJ4 | 7,761 | 7.103 | 1,039 | 896 | Medium | Small |
| de Havilland Hercules | 7,000 | | | | Medium | Small |
| Embraer Phenom 100 | 4,800 | 4.43 | 975 | 741 | Light | Small |

== Helicopters ==
MTOW = Maximum take-off weight

| Type | MTOW [pounds] | MTOW [kg] | Power output [kW] | Power to weight [W/kg] | Rotor diameter [m] |
|---|---|---|---|---|---|
| Mil V-12 | 231,485 | 105,000 | 19,200 | 182 | 2 x 35 |
| Mil Mi-26 | 123,459 | 56,000 | 17,000 | 343 | 1 x 32 |
| Sikorsky CH-53K | 88,000 | 39,916 | 16,200 | 405 | 1 x 24 |
| Sikorsky CH-53E | 73,500 | 33,300 | 9,810 | 294 | 1 x 24 |
| Boeing CH-47D/F Chinook | 50,000 | 22,680 | 7,058 | 311 | 2 x 18.3 |
| Sikorsky S-64 Skycrane | 42,000 | 19,051 | 6,800 | 357 | 21.9 |
| Mil Mi-38 | 34,392 | 15,600 | 4,200 | 269 | 21.1 |
| AgustaWestland AW101 | 34,392 | 14,600 | 4,698 | 321 | 1 x 18.59 |
| Sikorsky S-92 | 26,500 | 12,020 | 3,758 | 312 | 1 x 17.17 |
| Eurocopter EC225 Super Puma | 24,692 | 11,200 | 3,552 | 317 | 1 x 16.2 |
| Boeing Vertol CH-46 Sea Knight | 24300 | 11,000 | 2,800 | 254 | 2 x 15.24 |
| NHIndustries NH90 | 23,370 | 10,600 | 3,324 | 314 | 1 x 16.3 |
| Eurocopter AS532 Cougar | 19,840 | 9,000 | 2,370 | 263 | 1 x 15.6 |
| Airbus Helicopters H160 | 13,340 | 6,050 | 1,910 | 316 | 1 x 13.4 |
| Bell 412EP | 1,1900 | 5,397 | 1,864 | 345 | 1 x 14.0 |
| Eurocopter EC145 C-2 | 7,903 | 3,585 | 1,100 | 307 | 1 x 11.0 |
| Eurocopter EC135 P2+/T2+ | 6,415 | 2,910 | 944 | 325 | 1 x 10.2 |
| Eurocopter EC635 P2 | 6,393 | 2,900 | 1,218 | 420 | 1 x 10.2 |
| AeroVelo Atlas (human powered) | 282 | 128 | 1.1 | 8.5 | 4 x 20.2 |

== Convertiplanes ==
MTOW = Maximum take-off weight

| Type | MTOW [kg] | Power output [kW] | Power to weight [W/kg] | Rotor diameter [m] |
|---|---|---|---|---|
| Bell Boeing V-22 Osprey | 27,445 | 6,150 | 224 | 2 x 11.58 |
| Bell-Agusta BA609 | 7,600 | 1,447 | 190 | 2 x 7.92 |
| Bell XV-15 | 6,009 | 1,156 | 192 | 2 x 7.62 |

== See also ==
- Wide-body aircraft
