= Myasishchev M-50 =

Soviet prototype supersonic strategic bomber

M-50
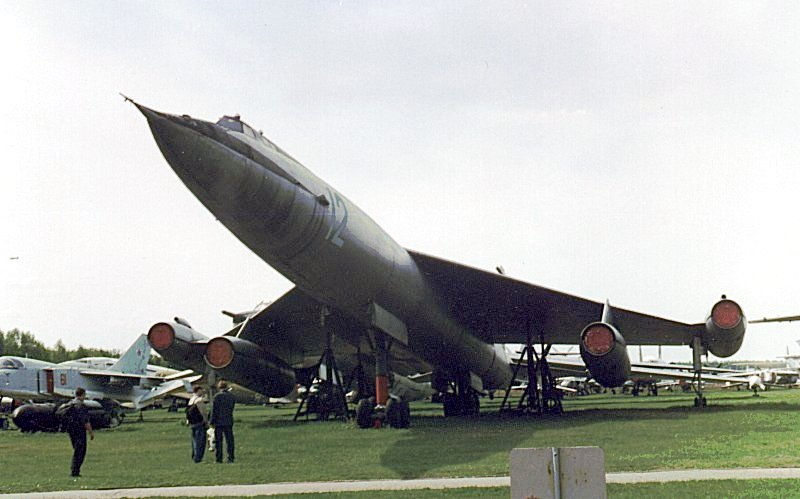
- Myasishchev M-50 on display at Monino Aviation Museum

General information
- Type: Supersonic strategic bomber
- National origin: Soviet Union
- Manufacturer: Myasishchev
- Status: Retired
- Primary user: Soviet Union
- Number built: 1 (+1 static test airframe), 1 M-52

History
- First flight: 27 October 1959

The Myasishchev M-50 (Russian: Мясищев М-50; NATO reporting name: Bounder) is a Soviet prototype four-jet engine supersonic strategic bomber which never attained service. Only one flightworthy prototype was built, which was first flown in October 1959. The M-50 was constructed by the Myasishchev design bureau.

== Design and development ==
The M-50 was a fast jet bomber with four engines: two Dobrynin VD-7 non-afterburning turbojet engines at the outer and two VD-7F afterburning turbojet engines at the inner positions. The two inner engines were located under the wing, and the two outer on the wingtips of its shoulder-mounted, truncated delta wings.

The second aircraft was designated M-52 and carried Zubets 16-17 turbofans, around which the aircraft had been designed. The engine installation was modified, and a second tailplane added to the top of the fin. The fore-end of the M-52 has been redesigned: in place of the tandem cockpit of the M-50 with seats in a row, the M-52 had a wider cockpit with the two pilots sitting side by side. The M-50 participated in a Soviet Aviation Day flyby in 1961. The M-52 was completed but was not flight-tested.

An unmanned M-51 intercontinental cruise missile variant was developed, which would have delivered multiple warheads on targets in the contiguous United States.

Like most of the early 1960s supersonic strategic bomber projects, the M-50/52 program was terminated due to the development of intercontinental ballistic missiles and the priority assigned to the Soviet space program.

== Nuclear-powered bomber ==
The 1 December 1958 issue of Aviation Week included an article Soviets Flight Testing Nuclear Bomber claiming that the Soviets had made great progress in their own nuclear aircraft program. This was accompanied by an editorial on the topic as well. The magazine claimed that the aircraft was real beyond a doubt, stating that "A nuclear-powered bomber is being flight tested in the Soviet Union. It has been observed both in flight and on the ground by a wide variety of foreign observers from Communist and non-Communist countries." The aircraft in the photographs was later revealed to be the jet propelled M-50, not a nuclear-powered plane.

In reality, in the early 1960s Soviet Union did test a technology demonstrator for a nuclear-powered strategic bomber, Tupolev Tu-95LAL, similar to the somewhat earlier American Convair NB-36H project, but, being based on the turboprop Tu-95, it was never supersonic, it never flew under nuclear power (its main goal was to test the nuclear reactor shielding efficiency), and, moreover, it was developed by the Tupolev Design Bureau, as Myasischev company had lost the competition to develop the prototype. It was deemed successful, but further development dragged because of environmental concerns. When the functional ICBMs appeared, the majority of funding and development effort was shifted into that field, and in the early 1960s the project was stopped. On 9 July 1961, the M-50A made its 19th and last flight, participating at a flypast over the annual Tushino air show. This was the one and only public appearance of the giant, currently displayed at the Monino Museum outside Moscow.

== Specifications (M-50A) ==
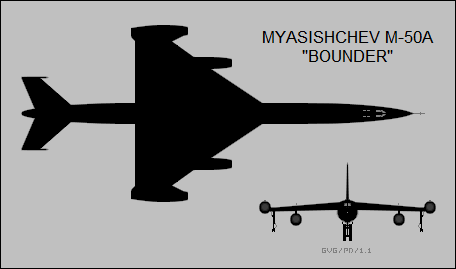
Myasishchev M-50A Bounder

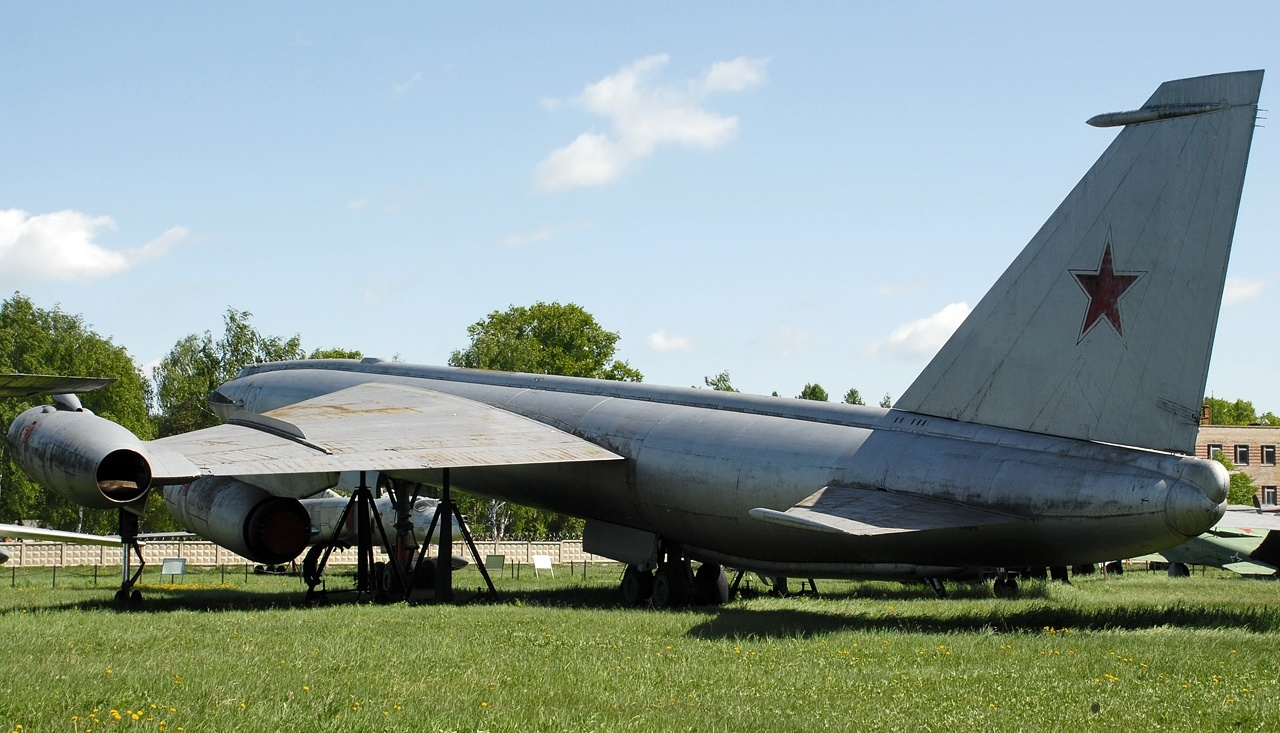
Rear view of the Myasishchev M-50

Data from The Osprey Encyclopaedia of Russian Aircraft 1875–1995

General characteristics

- Crew: 2
- Length: 57.48 m (188 ft 7 in)
- Wingspan: 25.10 m (82 ft 4 in)
- Height: 8.25 m (27 ft 1 in)
- Wing area: 290.6 m^{2} (3,128 sq ft)
- Empty weight: 85,000 kg (187,393 lb)
- Gross weight: 175,000 kg (385,809 lb)
- Max takeoff weight: 200,000 kg (440,925 lb)
- Powerplant: 2 × Dobrynin VD-7F afterburning turbojet, 137.29 kN (30,865 lbf) thrust each wet
- Powerplant: 2 × Dobrynin VD-7 non-afterburning turbojet, 110 kN (24,000 lbf) thrust each

Performance

- Maximum speed: 1,950 km/h (1,210 mph, 1,050 kn)
- Cruise speed: 1,500 km/h (930 mph, 810 kn)
- Range: 7,400 km (4,600 mi, 4,000 nmi)
- Service ceiling: 16,500 m (54,100 ft)
- Wing loading: 602 kg/m^{2} (123 lb/sq ft)
- Thrust/weight: 0.29

Armament

- 30,000 kg (66,000 lb) of bombs or missiles carried in internal bays, including M-59 and M-61 long-range cruise missiles

== See also ==
Aircraft of comparable role, configuration, and era

- Convair B-58 Hustler

== Bibliography ==
- Butowski, Piotr (July–August 1999). "Supersonic Mysasischchevs: More Details on the OKB's Frustrated Bombers". Air Enthusiast (82): 2–5. ISSN 0143-5450.
