= R-4 (missile) =

Soviet long-range air-to-air missile

R-4 AA-5 Ash
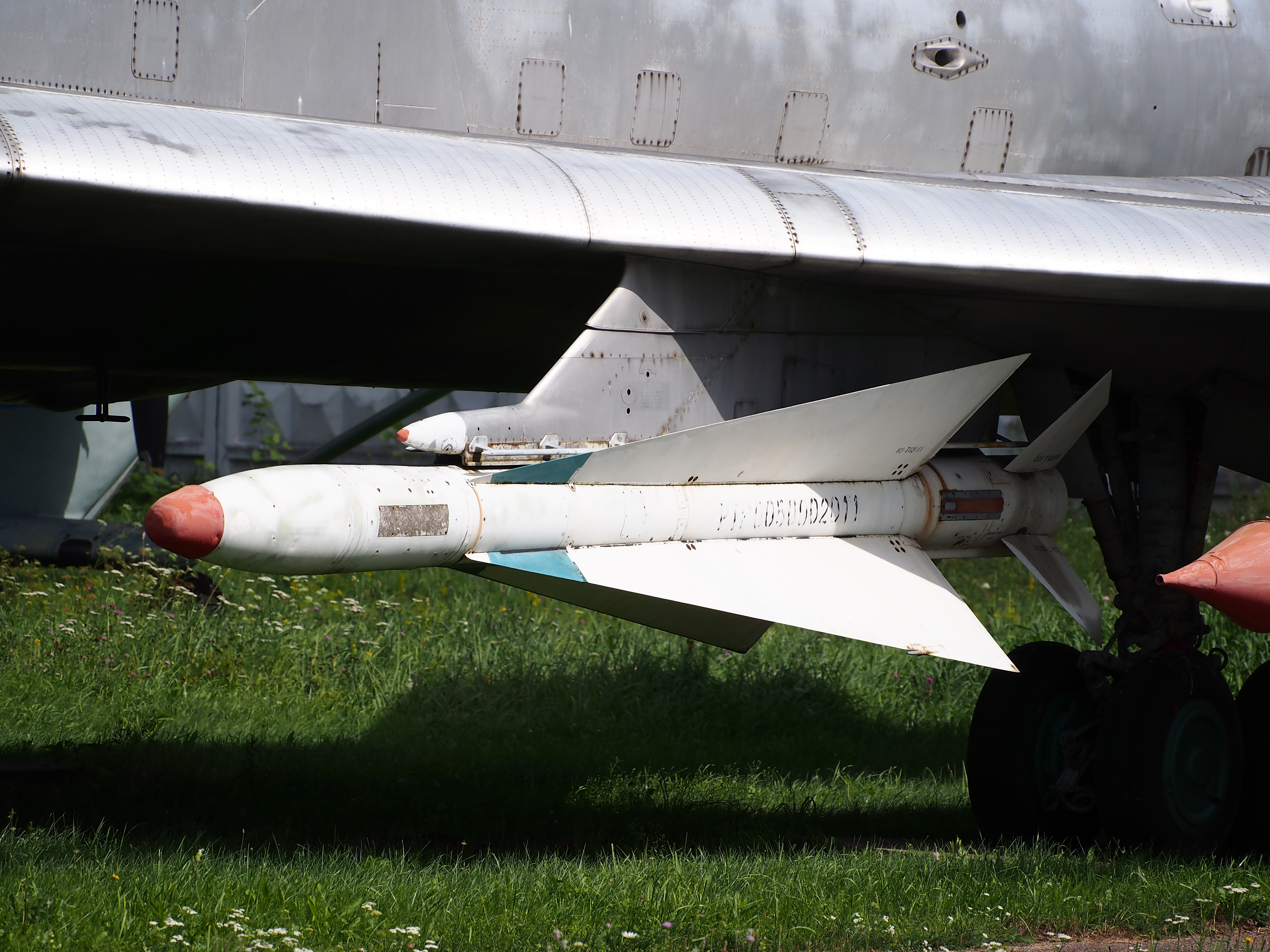
- R-4 missile under wing of Tupolev Tu-128
- Type: Heavy air-to-air missile
- Place of origin: Soviet Union

Service history
- In service: 1963-1990
- Used by: Soviet Air Forces

Production history
- Manufacturer: Bisnovat

Specifications (R-4R)
- Mass: 492.5 kg (1,086 lb)
- Length: 5.44 m (17 ft 10 in)
- Diameter: 310 mm (12 in)
- Warhead: High explosive
- Warhead weight: 53 kg (117 lb)
- Engine: Solid-fuel rocket
- Operational range: 2 to 25 kilometres (1.2 to 15.5 mi)
- Maximum speed: Mach 1.6
- Guidance system: Semi-active radar homing (R-4R); Infrared homing (R-4T)
- Launch platform: Tu-128

The Bisnovat (later Molniya) R-4 (NATO reporting name AA-5 'Ash') was an early Soviet long-range air-to-air missile. It was used primarily as the sole weapon of the Tupolev Tu-128 interceptor, matching its RP-S Smerch ('Tornado') radar.

== History ==
Development of the R-4 began in 1959, initially designated as K-80 or R-80, entering operational service around 1963, together with Tu-128. Like many Soviet weapons, it was made in both semi-active radar homing (R-4R) and infrared-homing (R-4T) versions. Standard Soviet doctrine was to fire the weapons in SARH/IR pairs to increase the odds of a hit. Target altitude was from 8 to 21 km. Importantly for the slow-climbing Tu-128, the missile could be fired even from 8 km below the target.

In 1973 the weapon was modernized to R-4MR (SARH) / MT (IR) standard, with lower minimal target altitude (0.5–1 km), improved seeker performance, and compatibility with the upgraded RP-SM Smerch-M radar.

The R-4 survived in limited service until 1990, retiring along with the last Tu-128 aircraft.

== Operators ==
Soviet Union

- Soviet Air Defence Forces

== Specifications (R-4T / R-4R) ==
- Length: (R-4T) 5.2 m (17 ft 1 in); (R-4R) 5.45 m (17 ft 10 in)
- Wingspan: 1300 mm (4 ft 3 in)
- Diameter: 310 mm (12.2 in)
- Launch weight: (R-4T) 480 kg (1,058 lb); (R-4R) 492.5 kg (1,086 lb)
- Speed: Mach 1.6
- Range: (R-4T) 2–15 km (9.35 mi); (R-4R) 2–25 km
- Guidance: (R-4T) infrared homing; (R-4R) semi-active radar homing
- Warhead: 53 kg (116.6 lb) high explosive
