= Dyagilevo and Engels air bases attacks =

Action during Russian invasion of Ukraine

The Dyagilevo and Engels air bases attacks were attacks on Russian air bases on two dates in December, 2022, by UAVs allegedly launched by Ukrainian forces in response to the 2022 Russian invasion of Ukraine. Both Engels Air Base in Saratov Oblast and Dyagilevo Air Base in Ryazan Oblast were attacked on December 5, 2022, followed by a further attack against Engels Air Base on December 26, 2022. Whilst the Russian Defense Ministry acknowledged these attacks and reported some casualties, Ukraine officials did not confirm it was responsible.

== Course of events ==
On the morning of December 5, 2022, the residents of the city of Engels reported hearing explosions. At 9 A.M, the governor of the Saratov region said that there were no casualties, and no civilian objects were damaged. Later, two Tu-95 aircraft were seriously damaged. That same morning, an attack on the Diaghilev air base was reported. A Tu-22M3 was damaged and a fuel tanker exploded, 3 people were killed and 6 people were injured.
