= Central Air Force Museum =

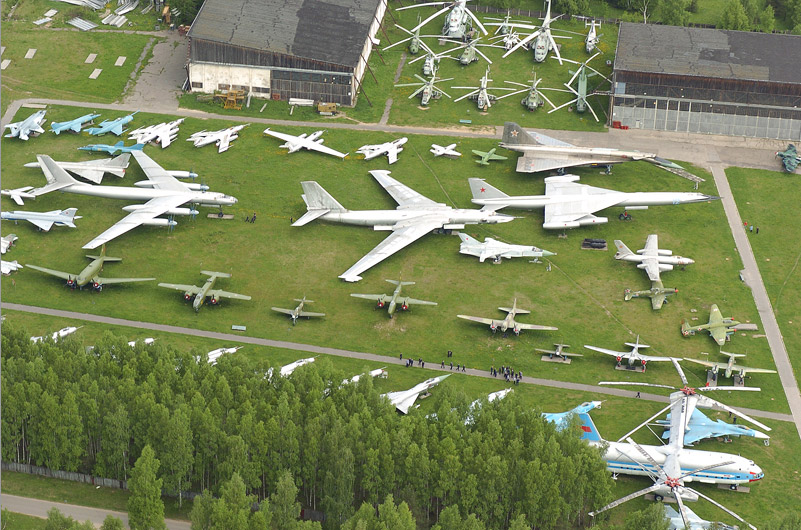
- Aerial view of the outdoor exhibit

- Location in Russia
- Established: 28 November 1958
- Location: Monino, Moscow Oblast, Russia
- Coordinates: 55.832778°N 38.183056°E
- Type: Aviation museum
- Website: https://www.cmvvs.ru/

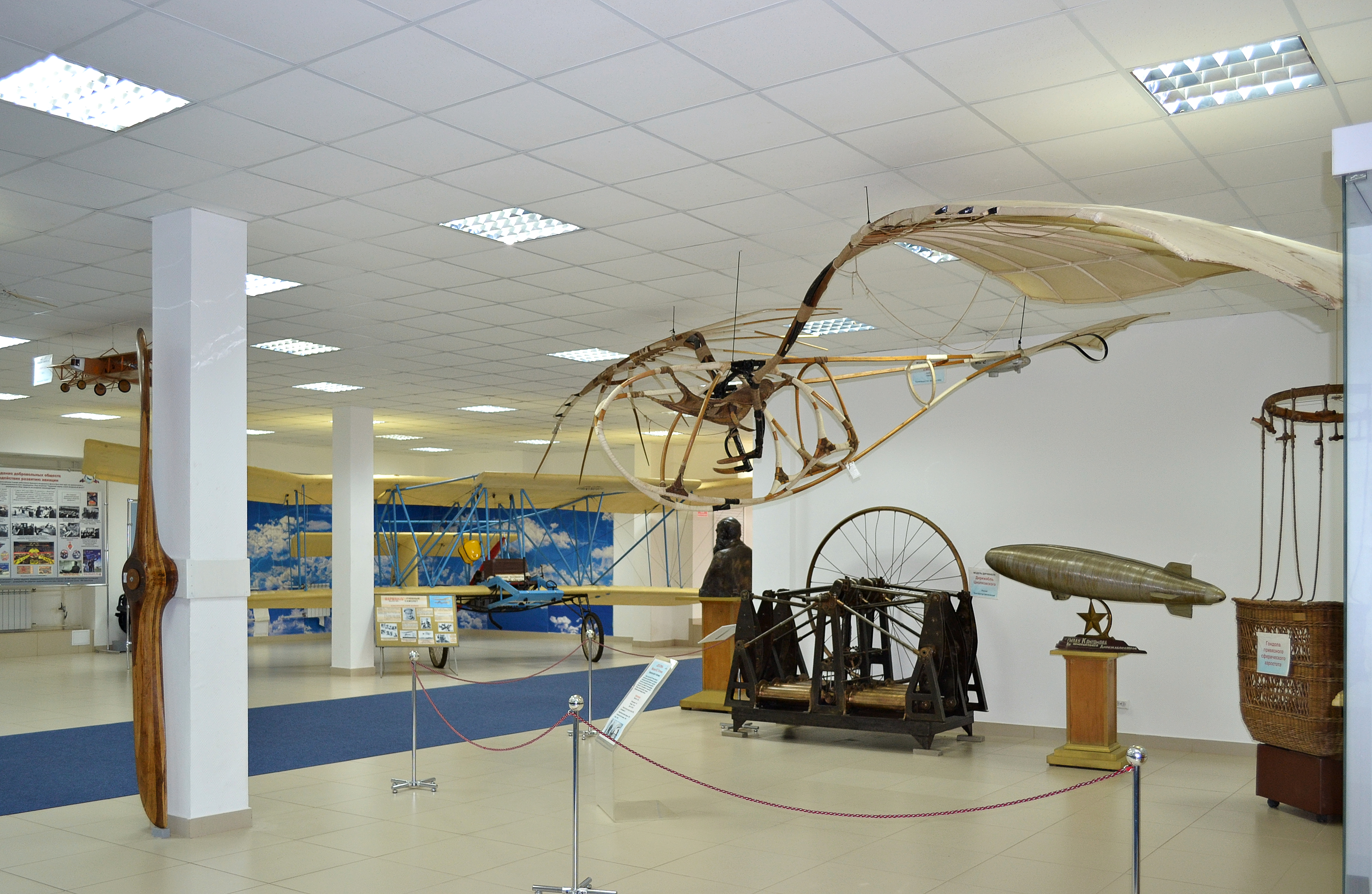
An exhibit room of the Central Air Force Museum.

The Central Air Force Museum (Russian: Центральный музей Военно-воздушных сил РФ) is an aviation museum in Monino, Moscow Oblast, Russia. A branch of the Central Armed Forces Museum, it is one of the world's largest aviation museums, and the largest for Soviet aircraft, with a collection including 173 aircraft and 127 aircraft engines on display. The museum also features additional displays, including Cold War-era American espionage equipment, weapons, instruments, uniforms, artwork, and a library containing books, films, and photos is also accessible to visitors.

The Central Air Force Museum is located on the grounds of the Gagarin Air Force Academy on the site of the former Monino Airfield, 40 km (25 mi) east of Moscow.

== History ==
The origins of the museum go back to 1940 when the village of Monino was selected to be the location of what is now the Gagarin Air Force Academy. The museum itself was founded in 1958, two years after the airfield was closed, and had 6 aircraft and 20 aircraft guns at the time. When it opened to the public another two years later in 1960, it had 14 aircraft. By early 1970, the museum's collection had expanded to about 40 aircraft. In 1990, the aircraft on display were rearranged according to design bureau and chronological order. The museum's main hall was mostly destroyed by fire in 2005. By 2013, a new hangar had been built to house the World War II aircraft. In 2016, it was reported that the museum was to close, with the exhibits being transferred to Patriot Park. New halls with the modern equipment for exhibitions were built. However, a new exhibition hall was opened in February 2020.

The museum contains a range of aircraft, both domestic and foreign, including military, civil and special purpose. The museum also houses associated pieces, such as the uniforms, documents, models and equipment related to the aircraft. The museum is currently open to members of the public to visit.

The museum has never published a catalog of exhibits or a guidebook. Anniversary books about the Gagarin Air Force Academy contain small sections with history and descriptions of exhibits. There is a photo gallery of the museum, taken in 1988-1994 by photographer Viktor Leontyev, a correspondent for a military newspaper. The use of a wide-format lens made it possible to preserve for history views of the museum, including the hall that later burned down.

== Aircraft on display ==
Transport and passenger aircraft

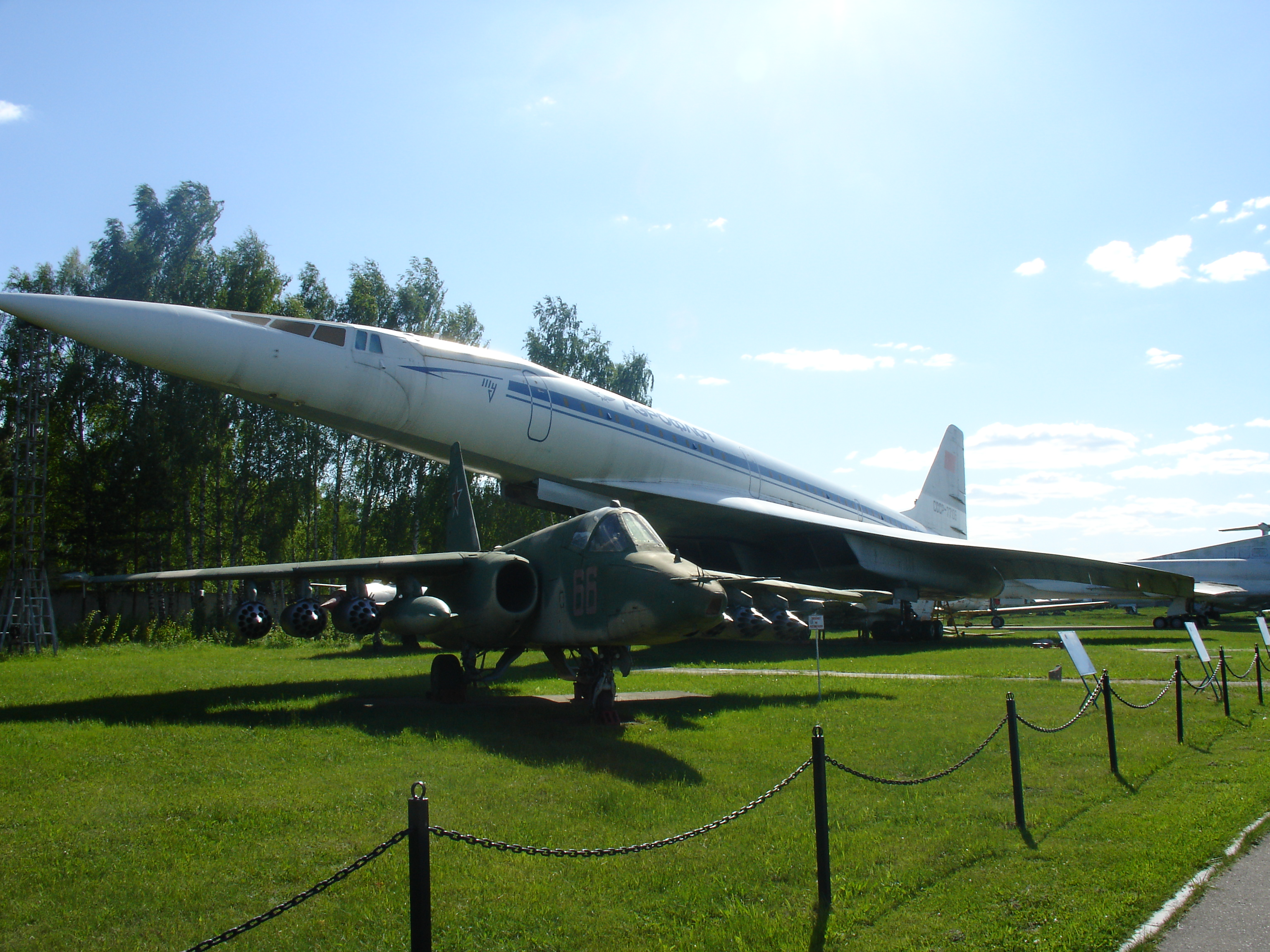
Tupolev Tu-144 (Charger)

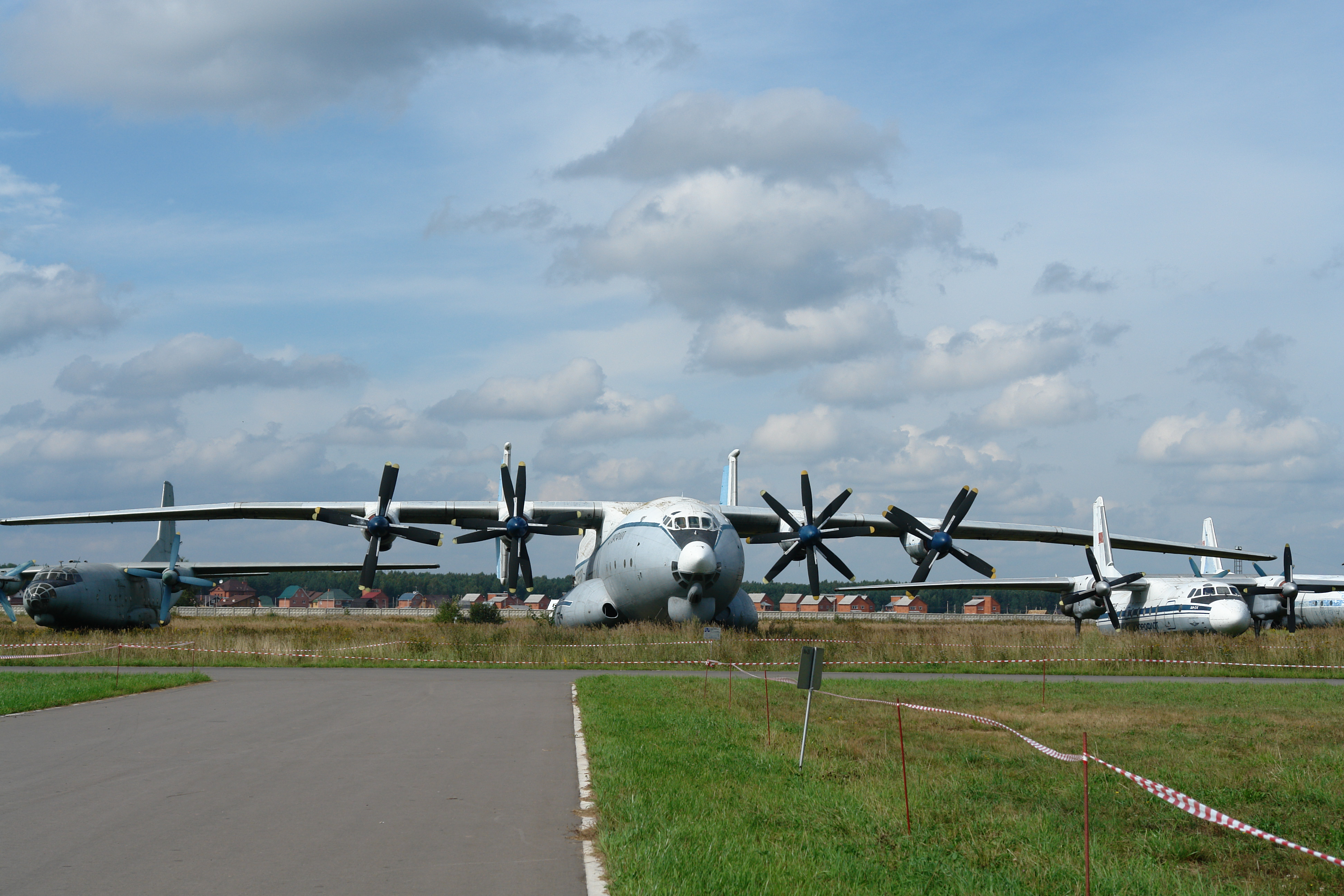
Antonov An-22 (Cock)

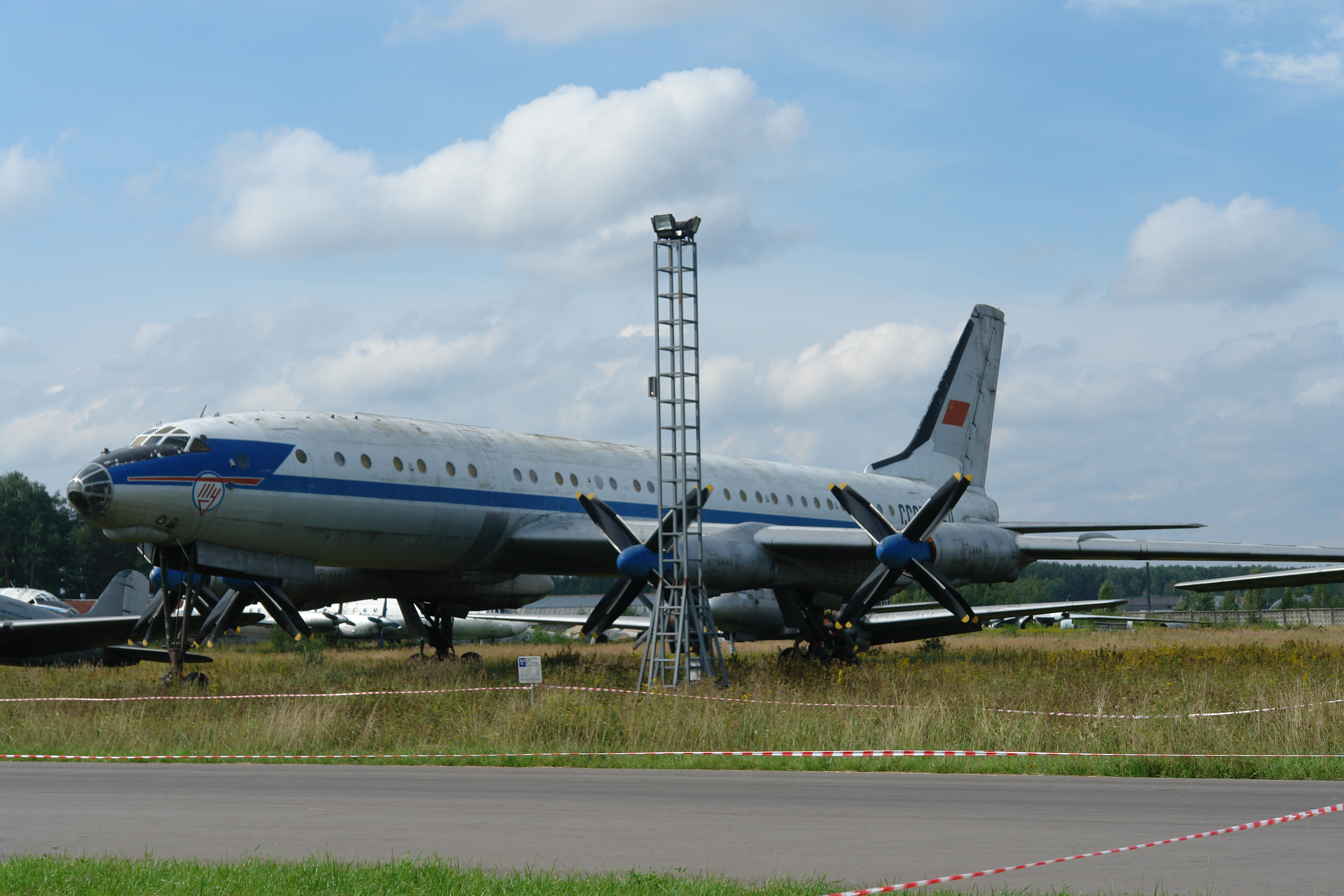
Tupolev Tu-114 (Cleat)

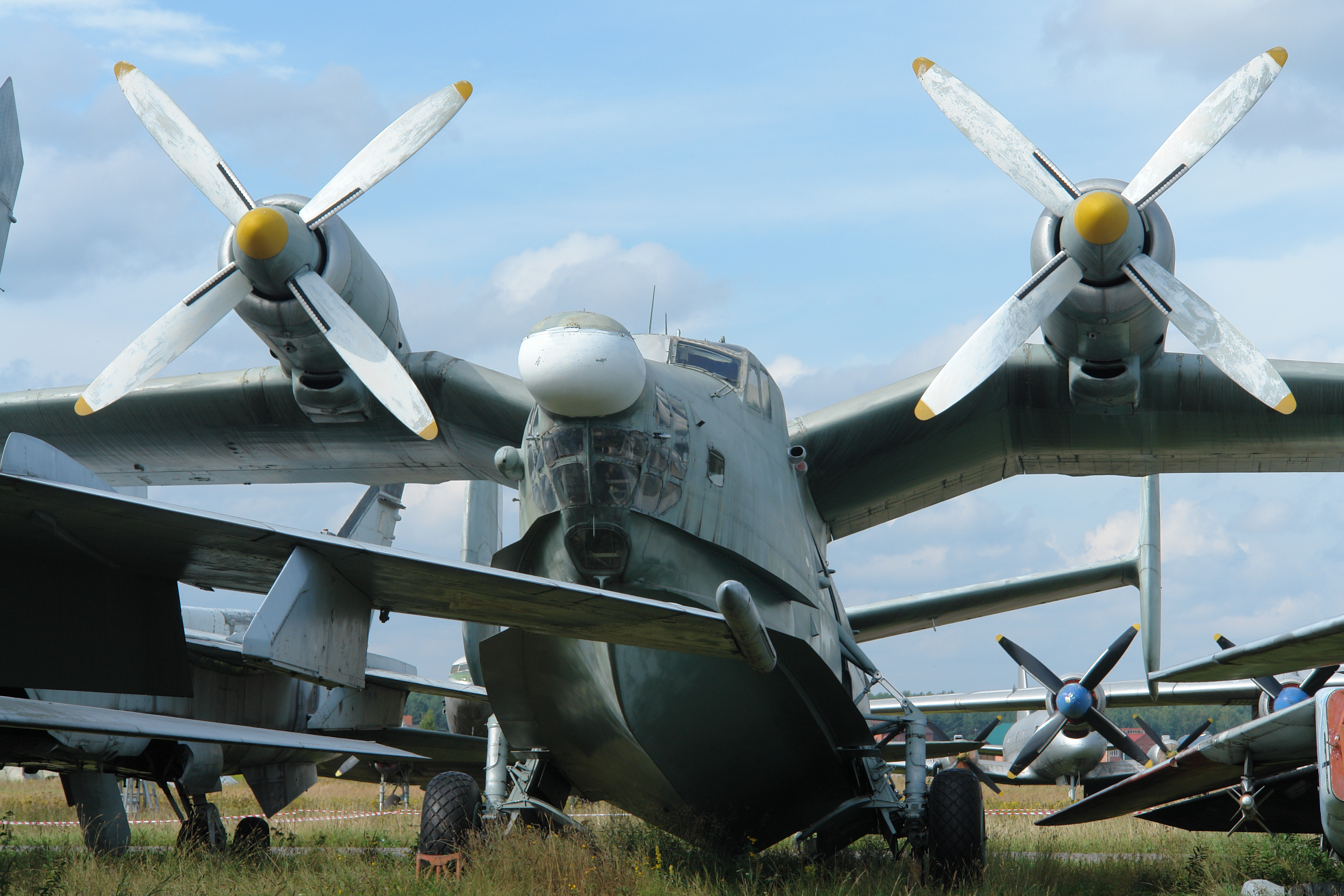
Beriev Be-12 (Mail)

Fighters and Attack aircraft

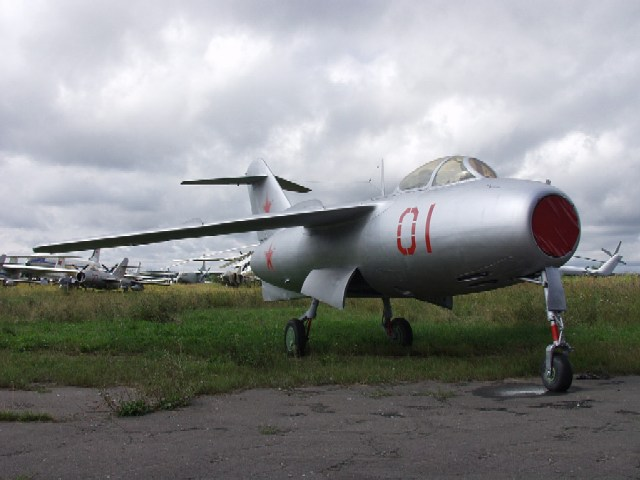
Lavochkin La-15 (Fantail)

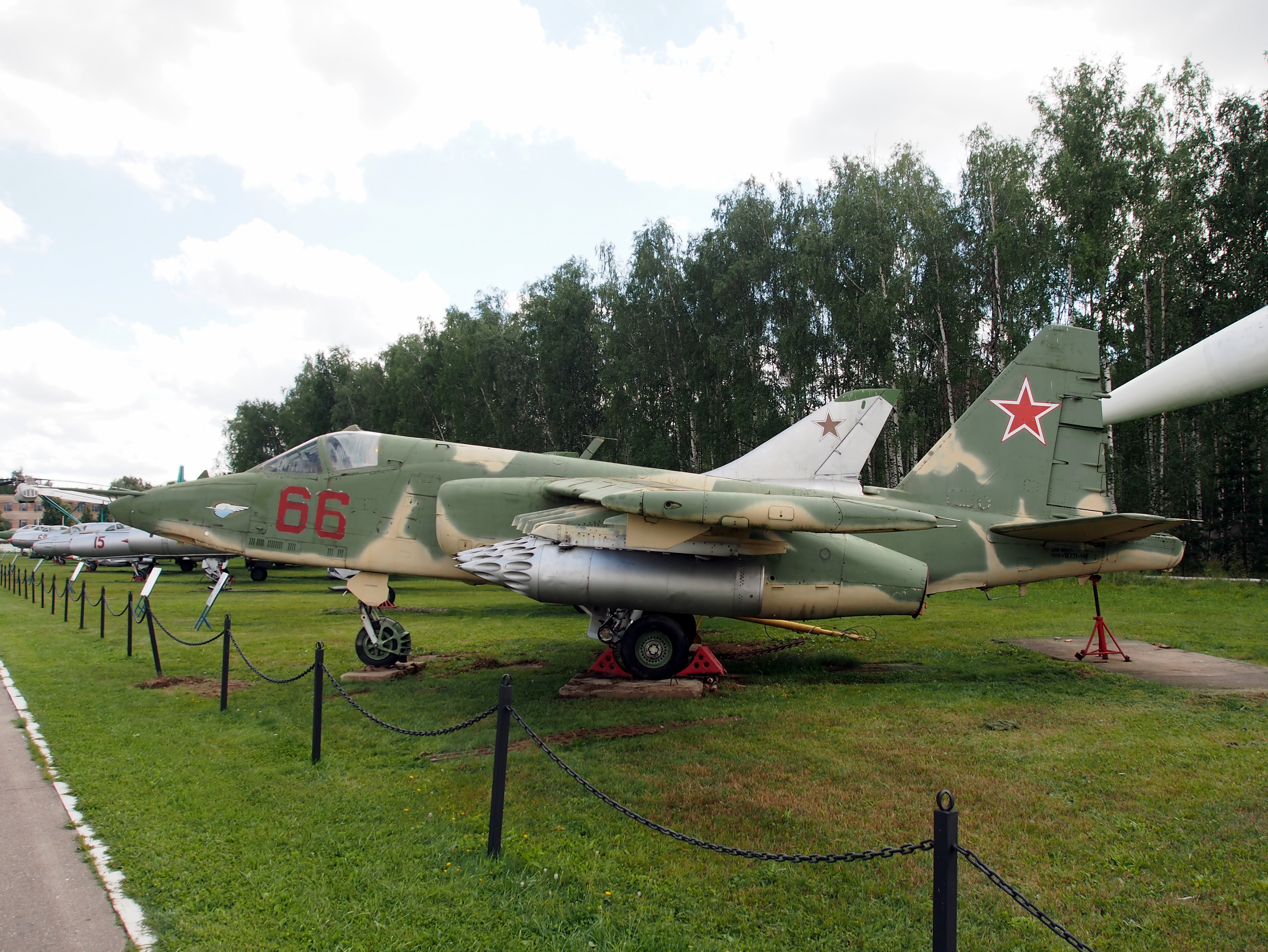
Sukhoi Su-25 (Frogfoot)

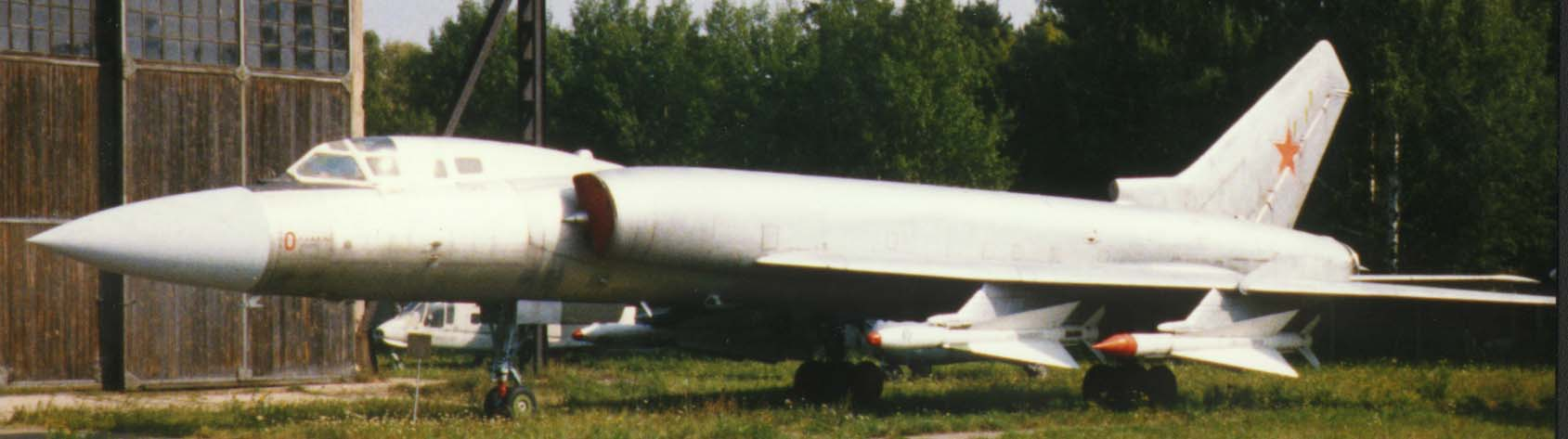
Tupolev Tu-128 (Fiddler)

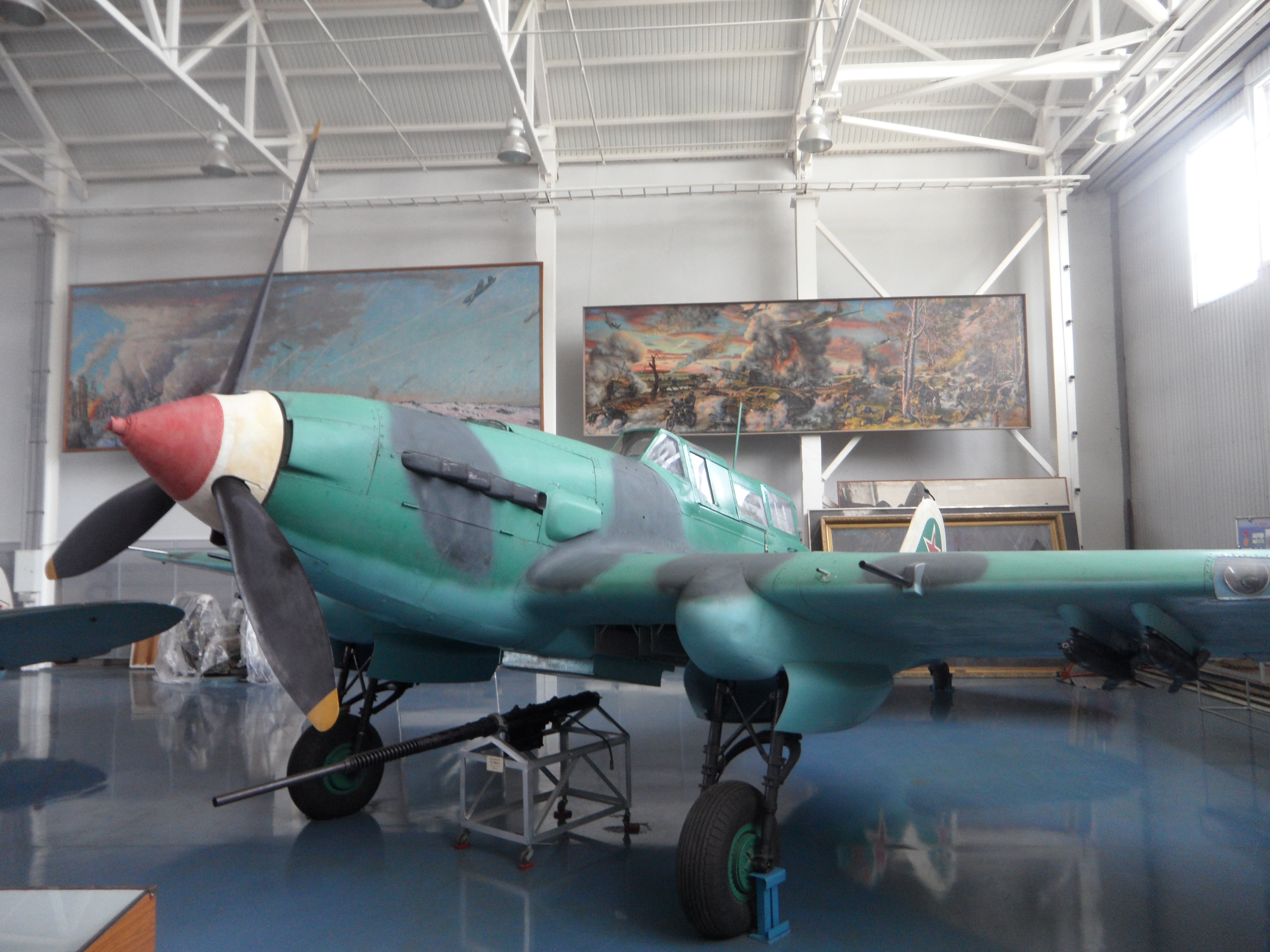
Ilyushin Il-2 (Bark)

Bombers

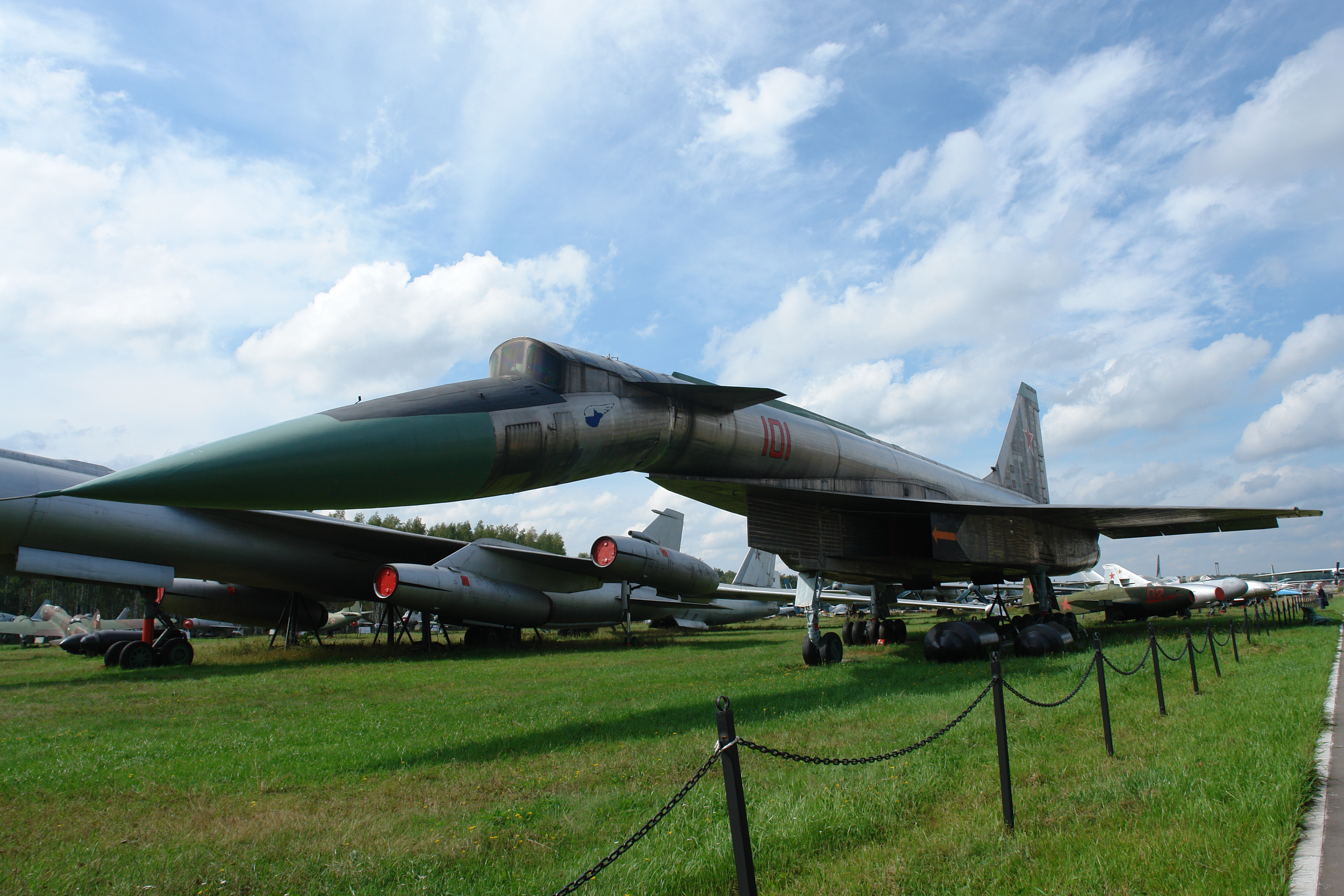
Sukhoi T-4 (Su-100)

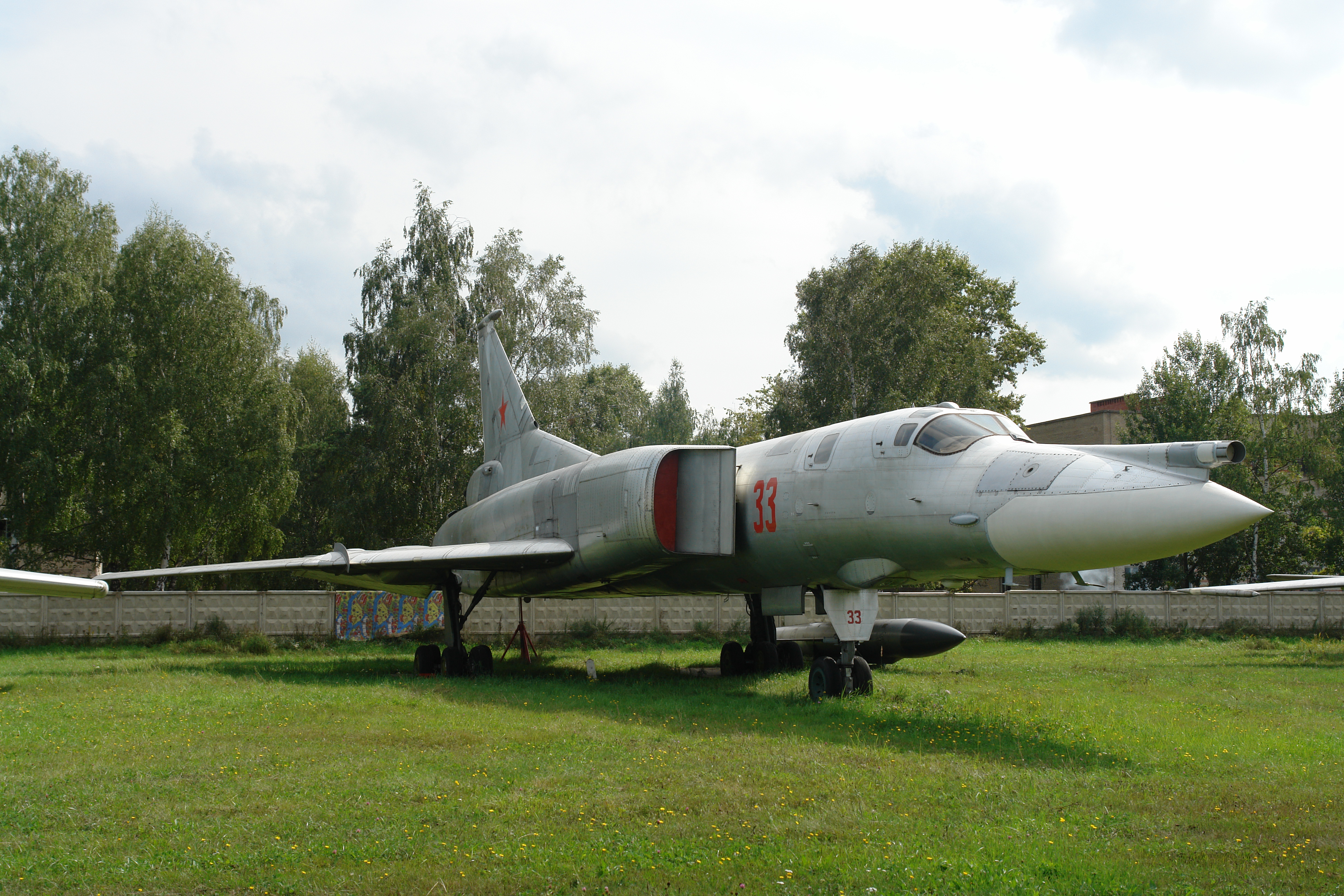
Tupolev Tu-22M (Backfire)

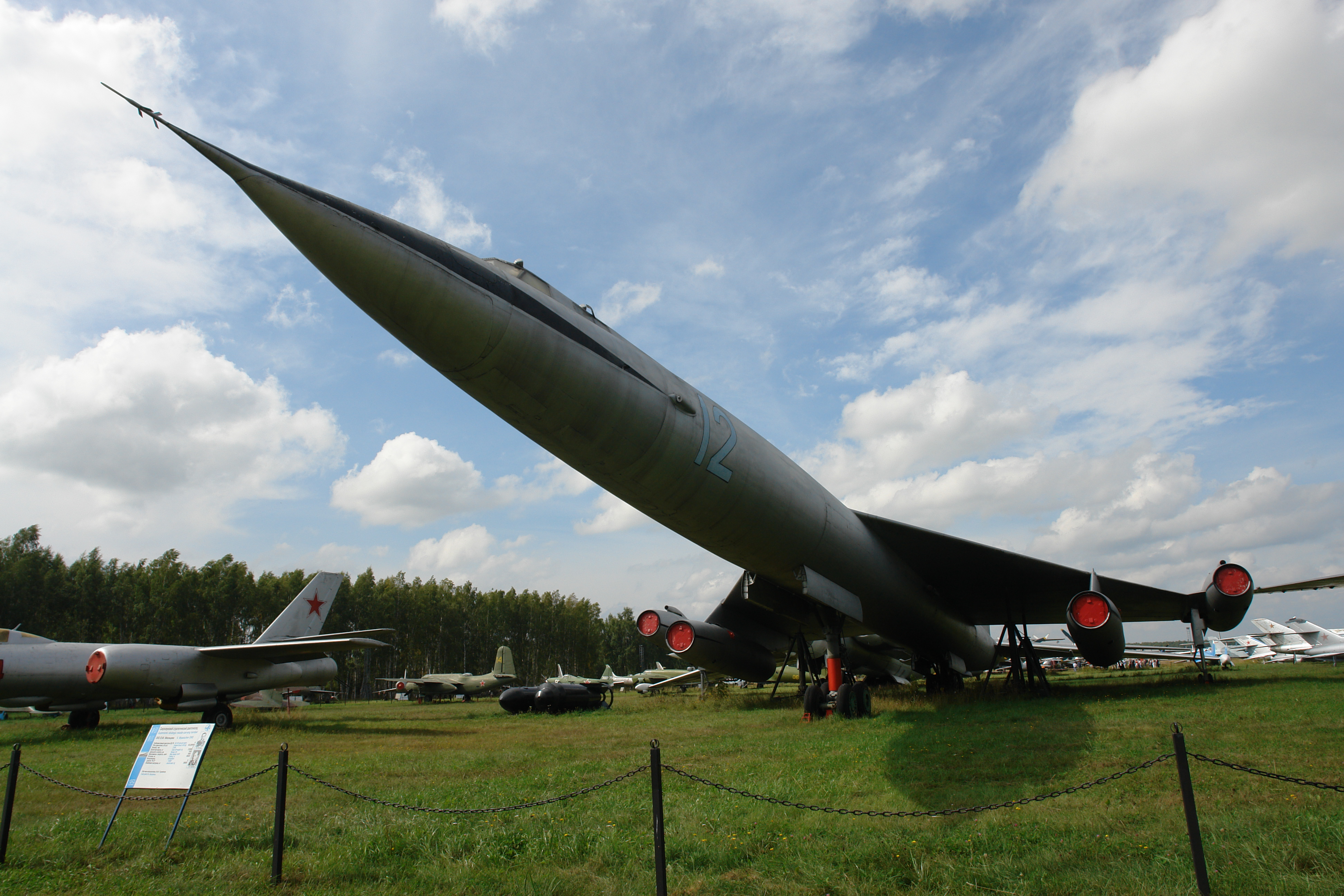
Myasishchev M-50 (Bounder)

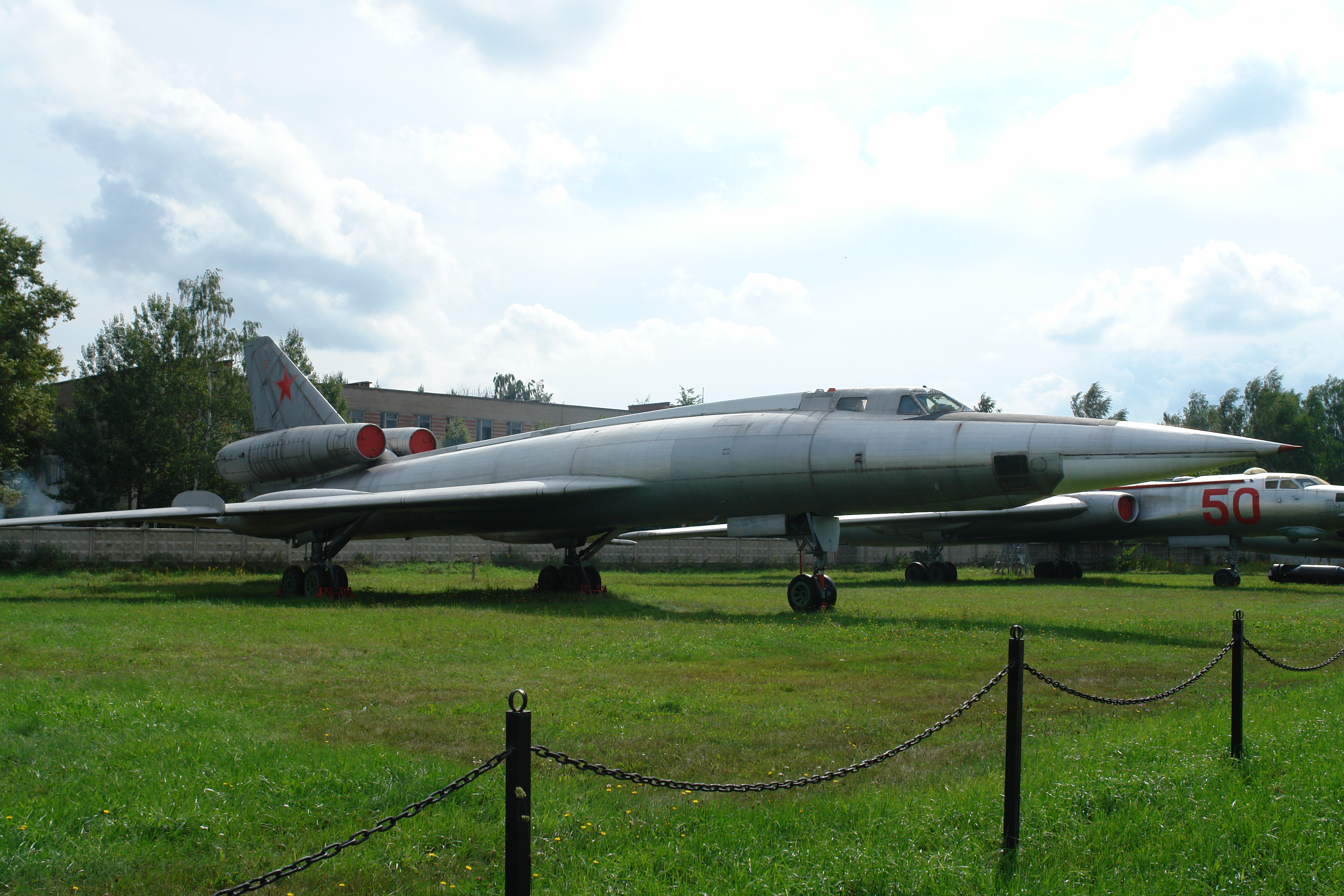
Tupolev Tu-22 (Blinder A)

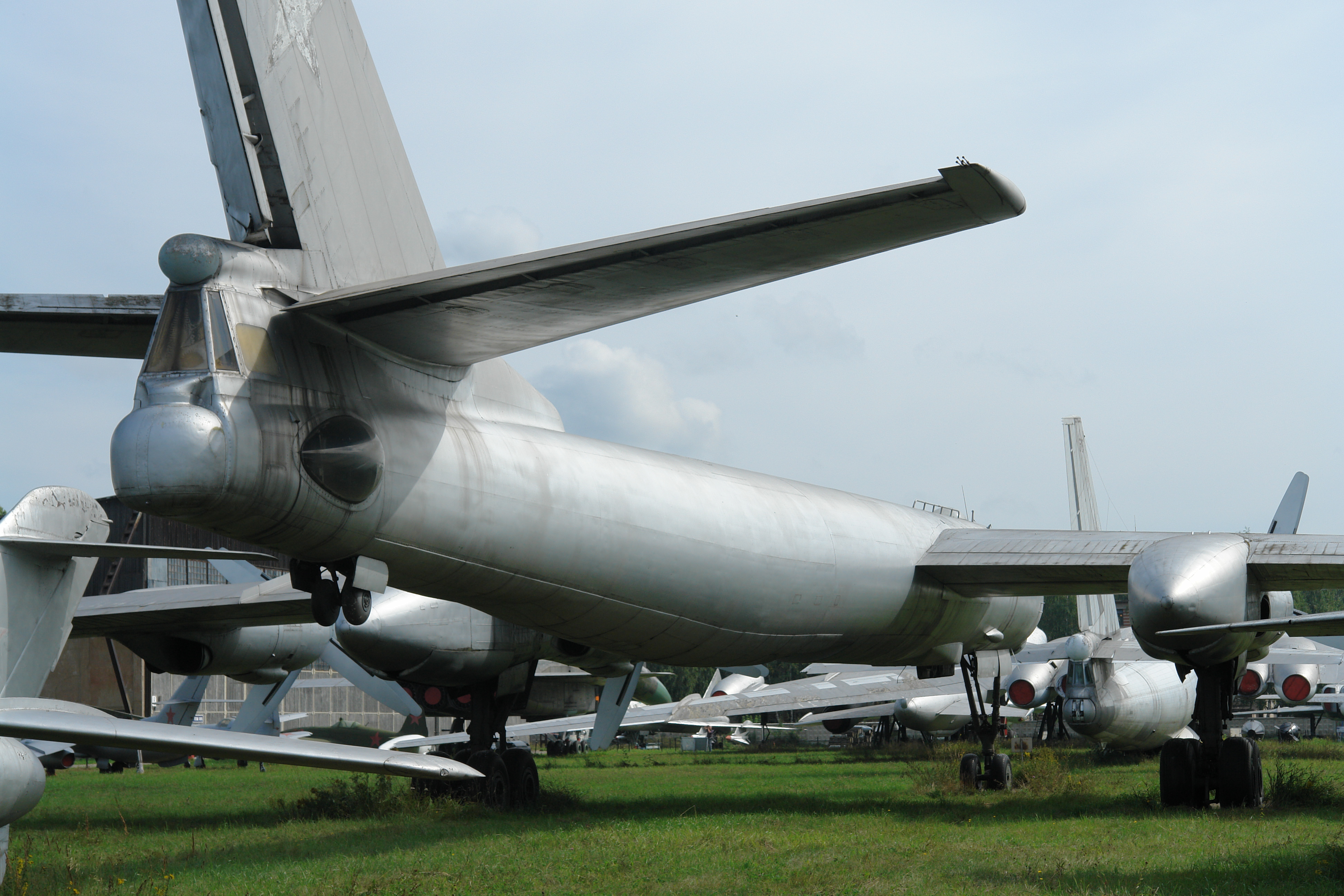
Tupolev Tu-95 (Bear)

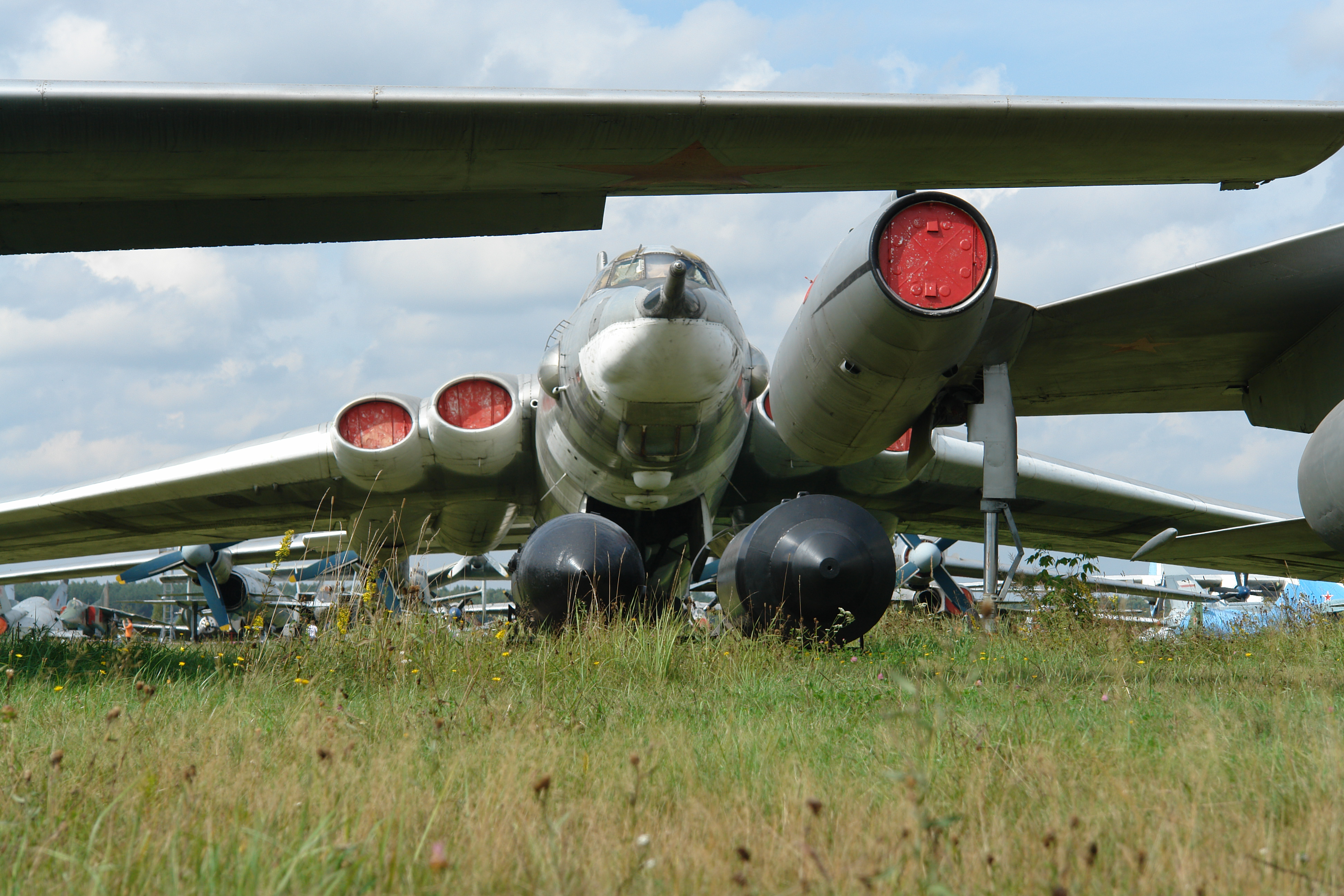
Myasishchev 3M (Bison)

Helicopters

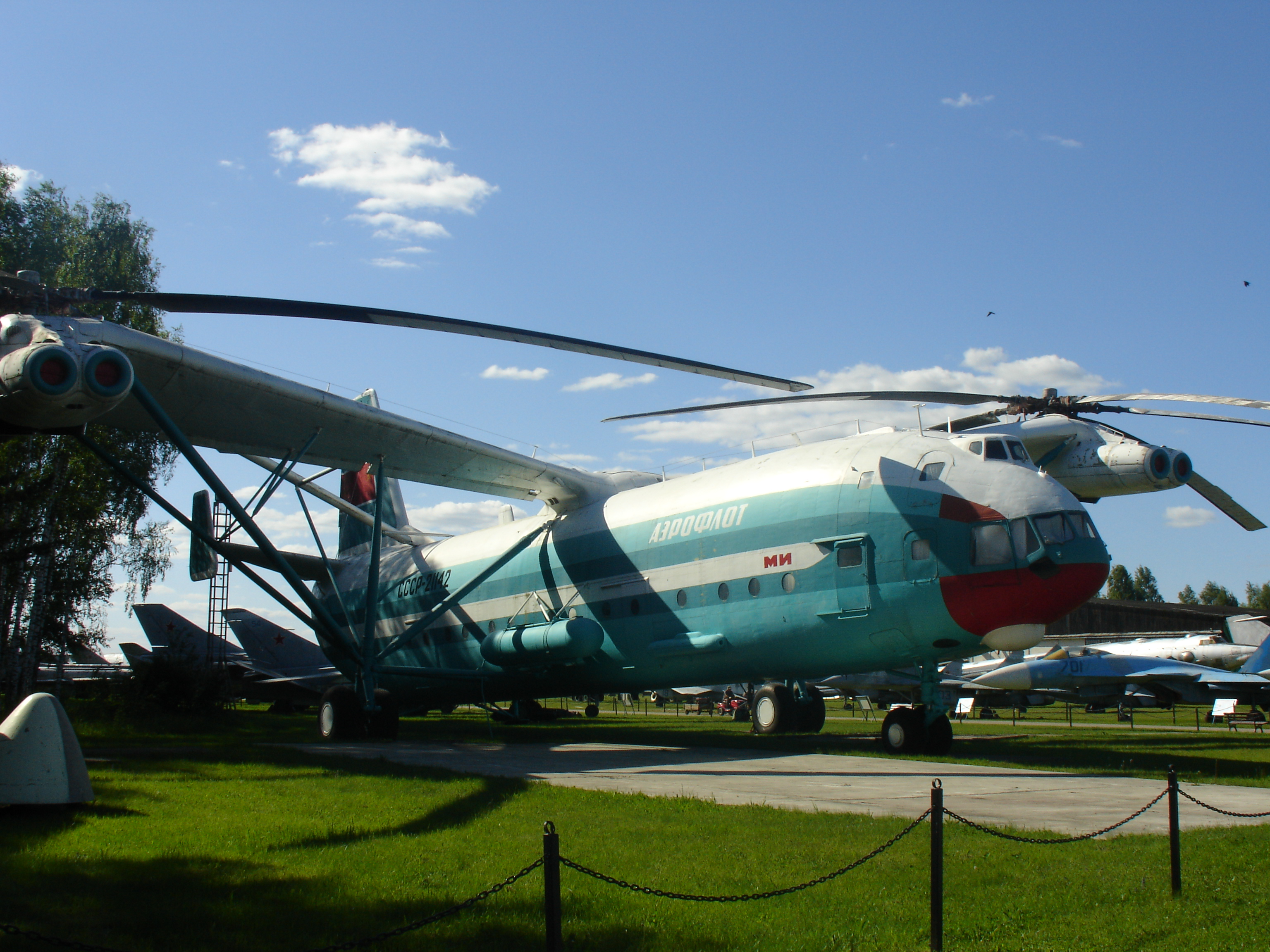
Mil Mi-12 (Homer)

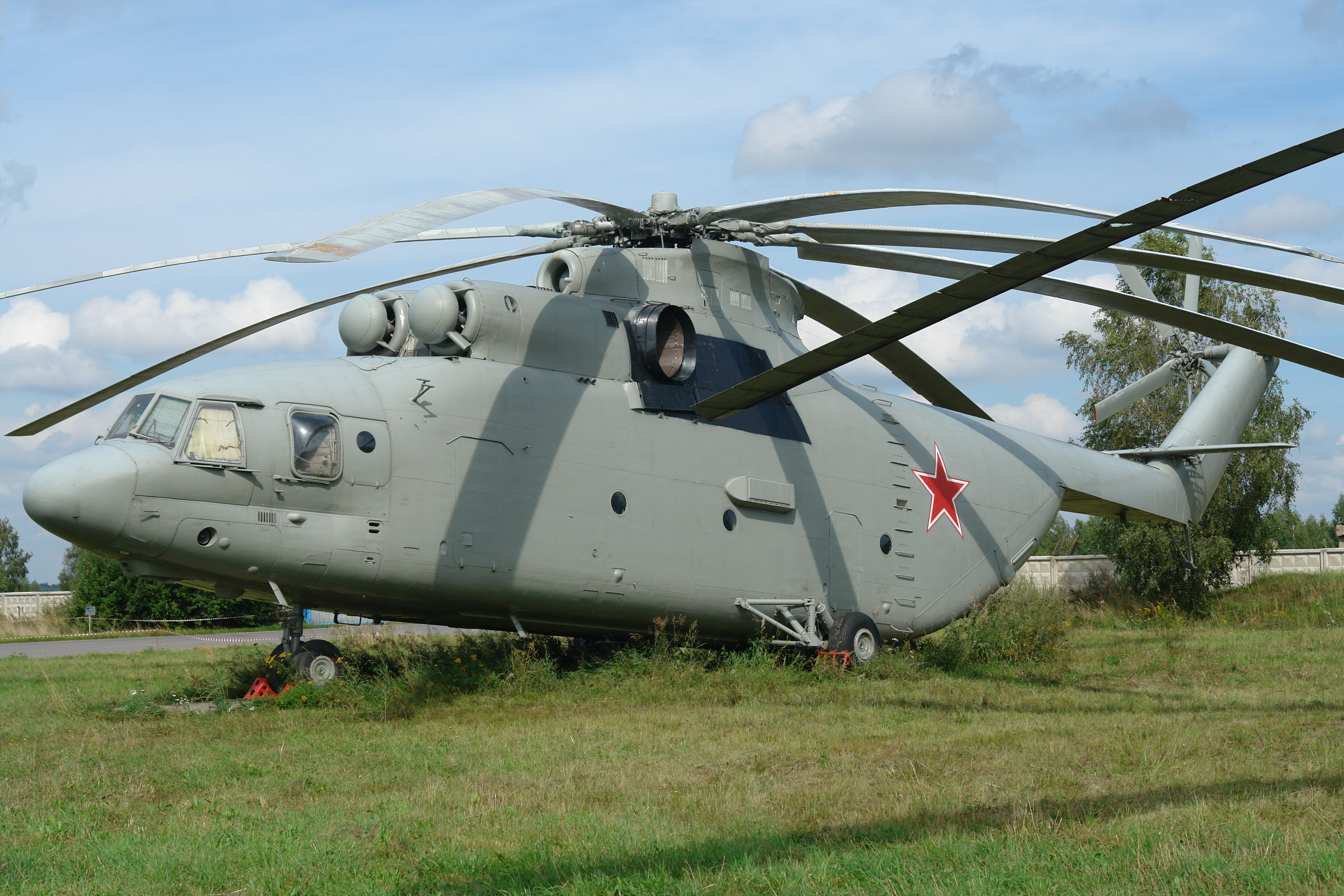
Mil Mi-26 (Halo)

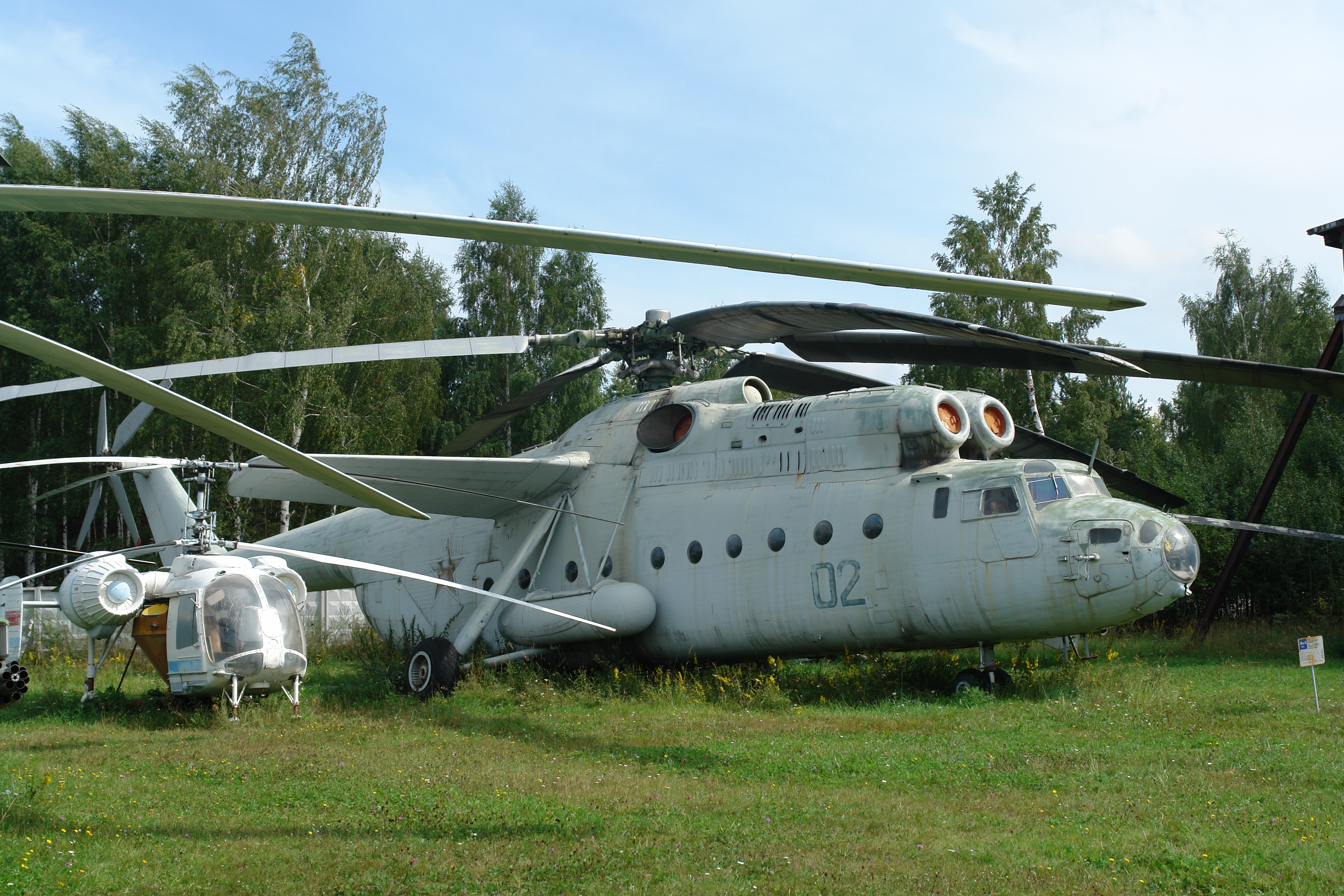
Mil Mi-6 (Hook)

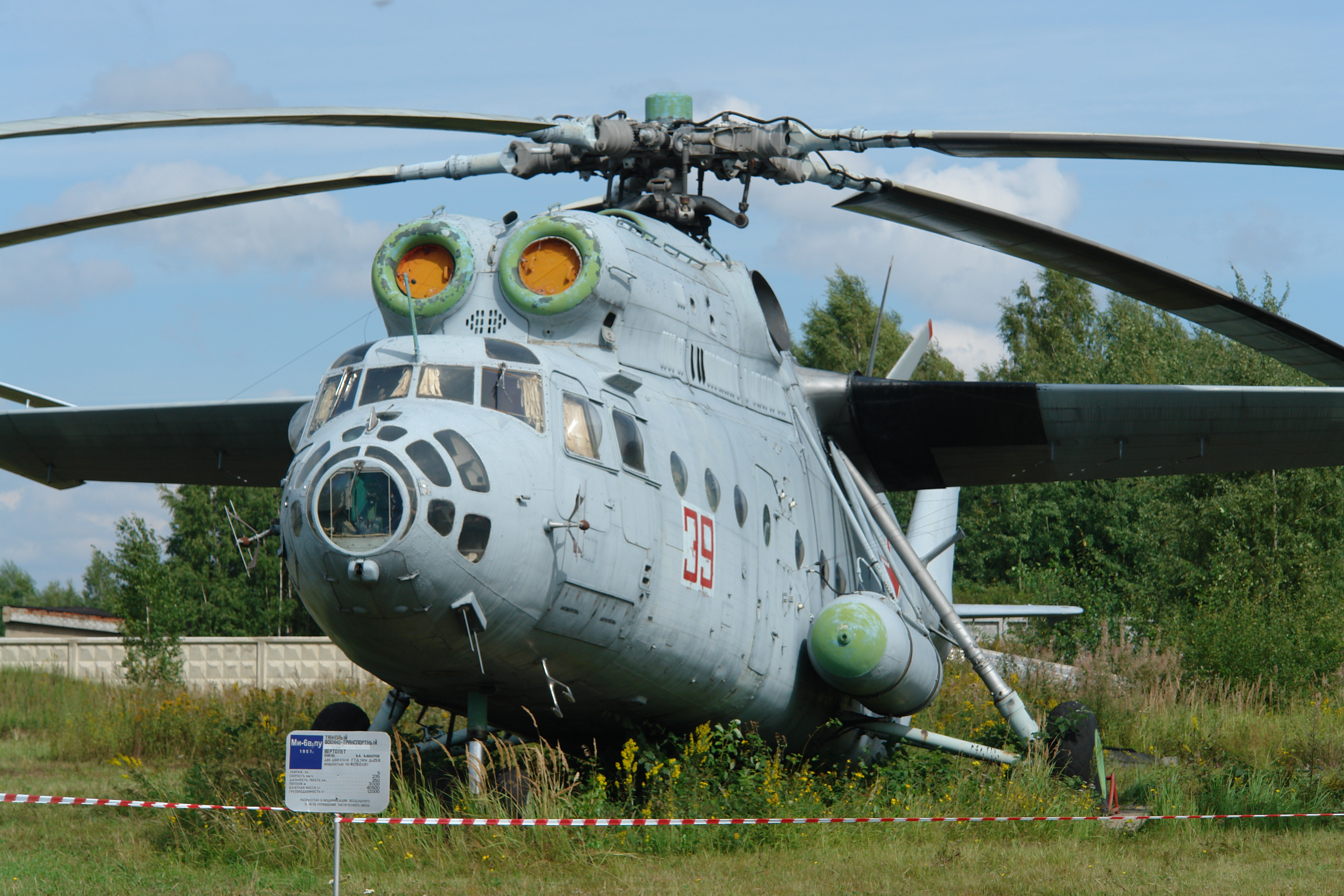
Mil Mi-6B (Hook)

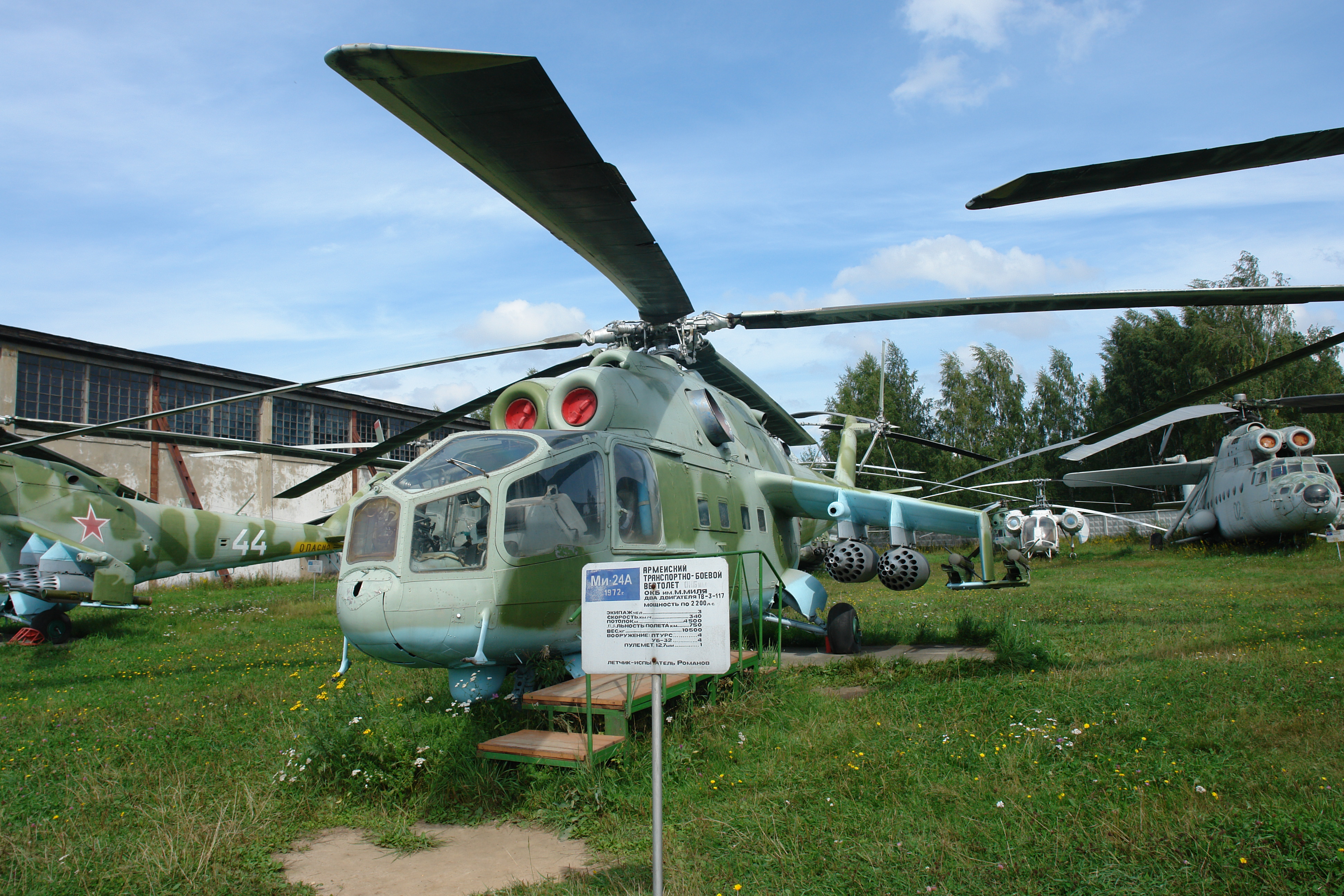
Mil Mi-24A (Hind-A)

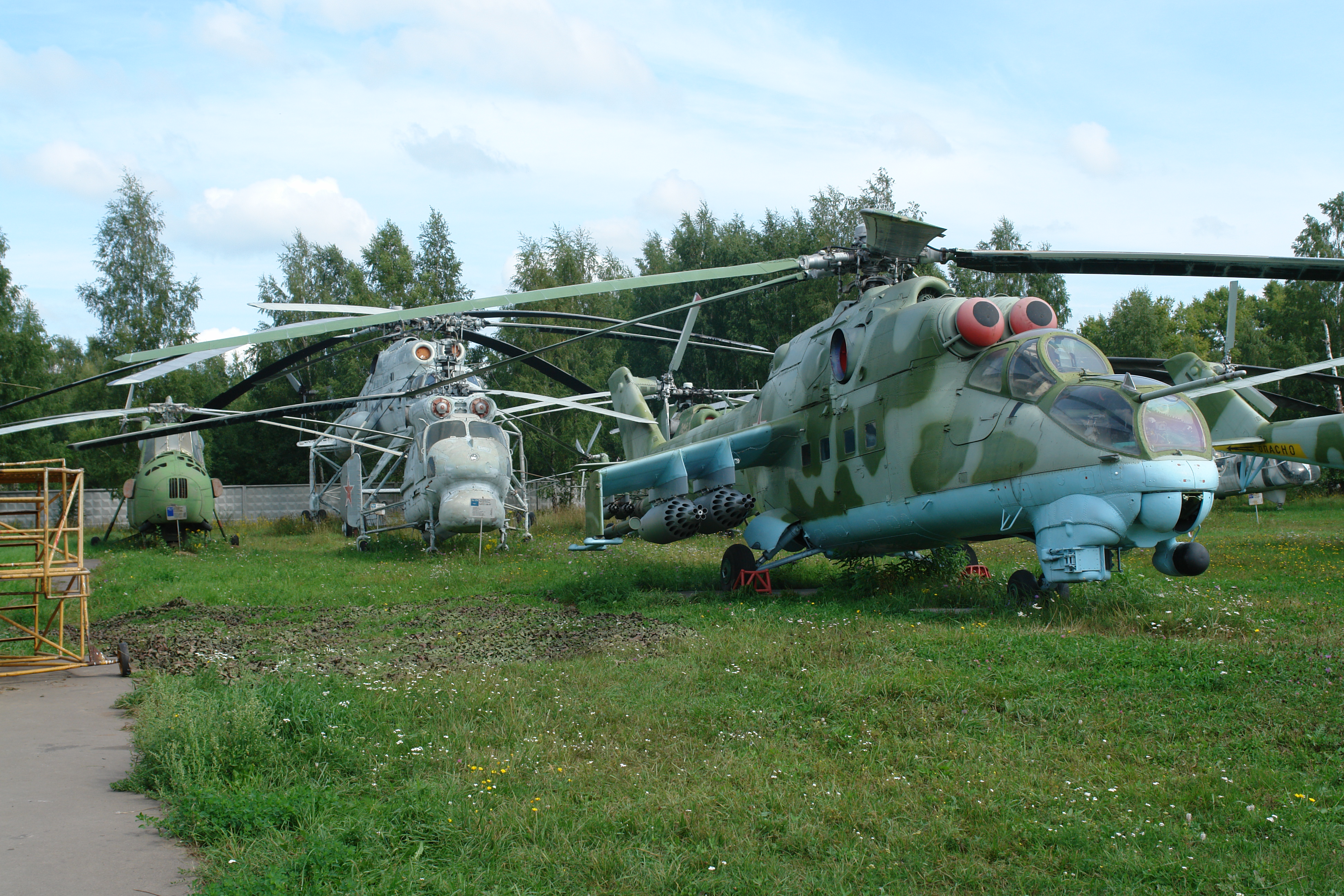
Mil Mi-25 (Hind-D)

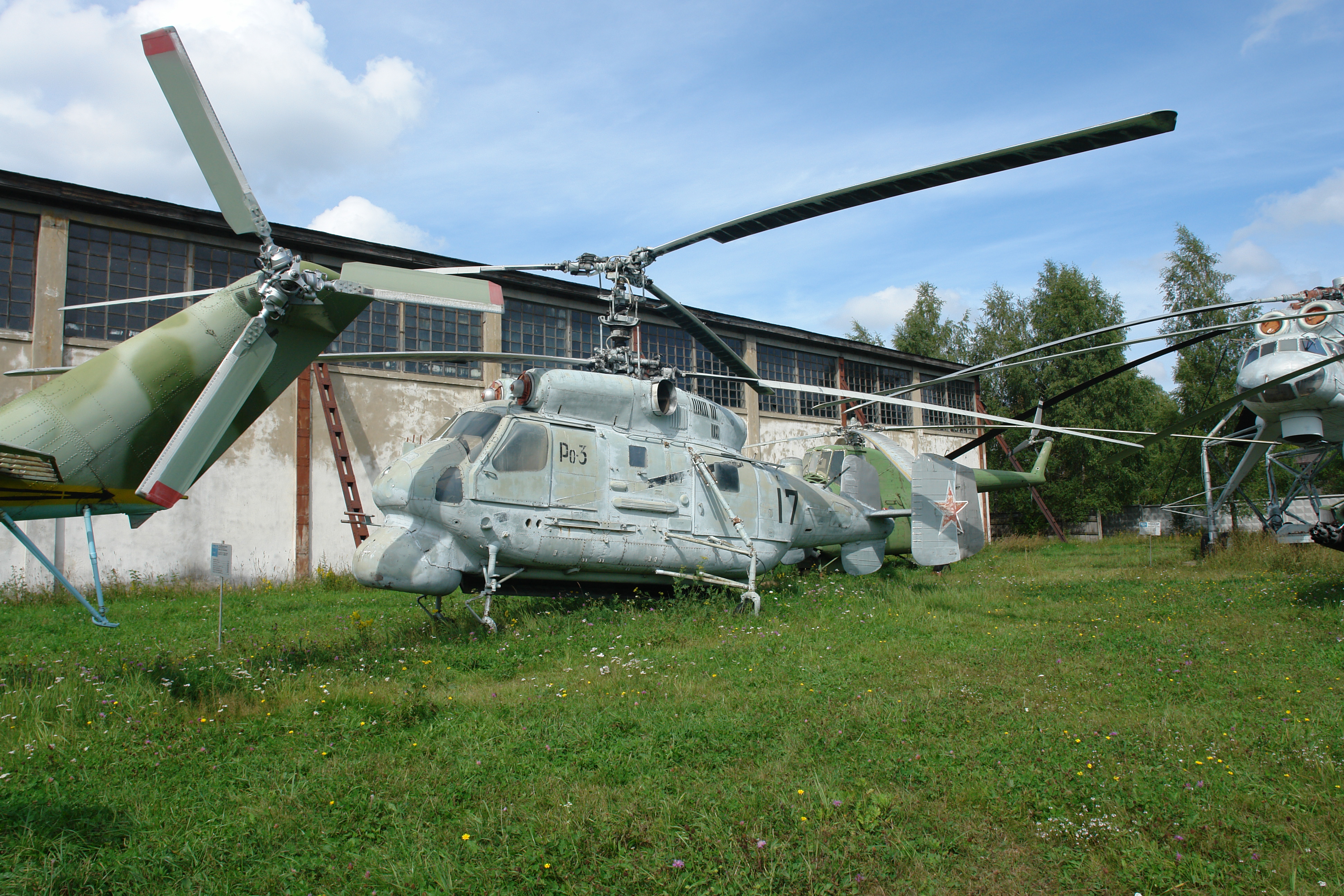
Kamov Ka-25 (Hormone)

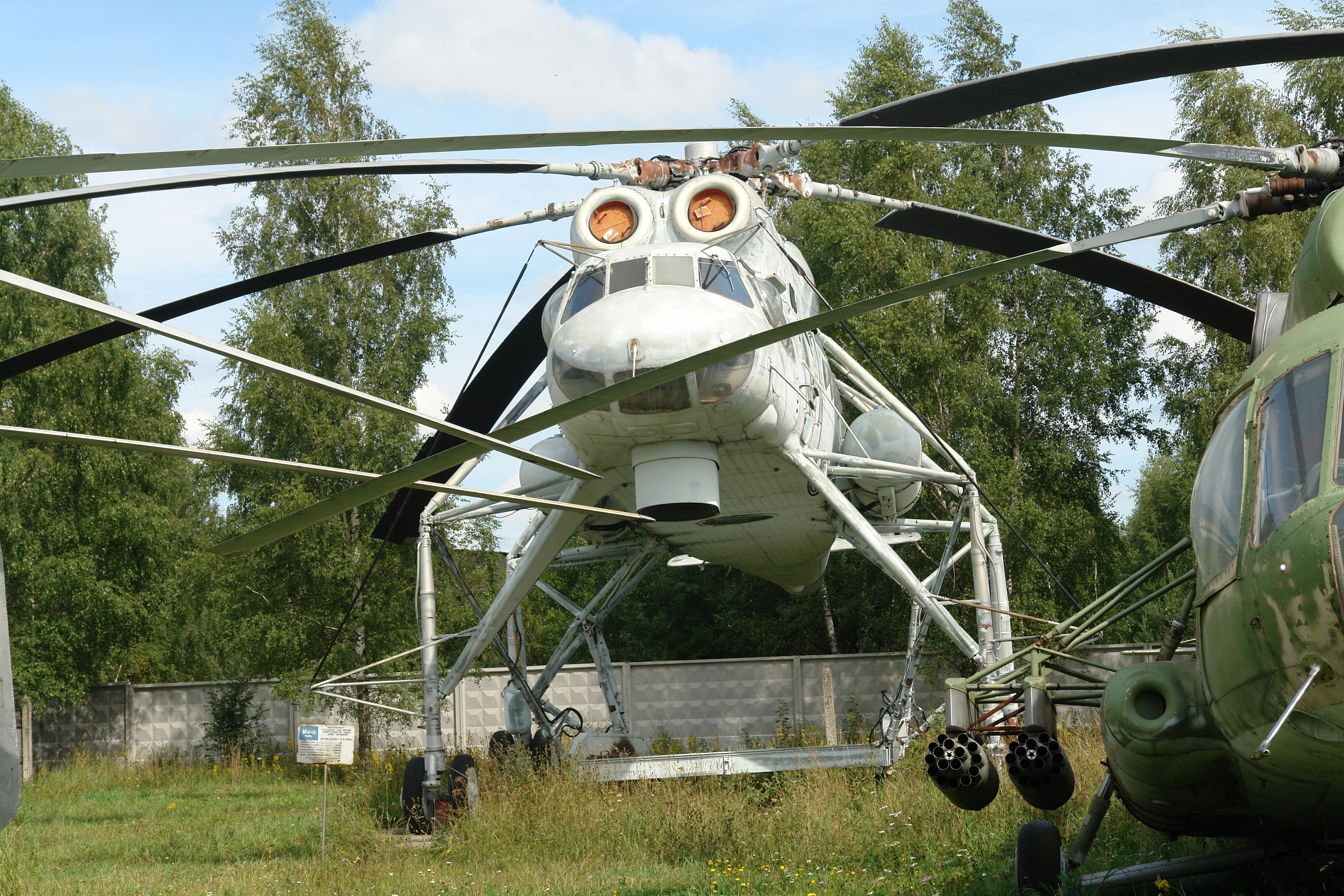
Mil Mi-10 (Harke)

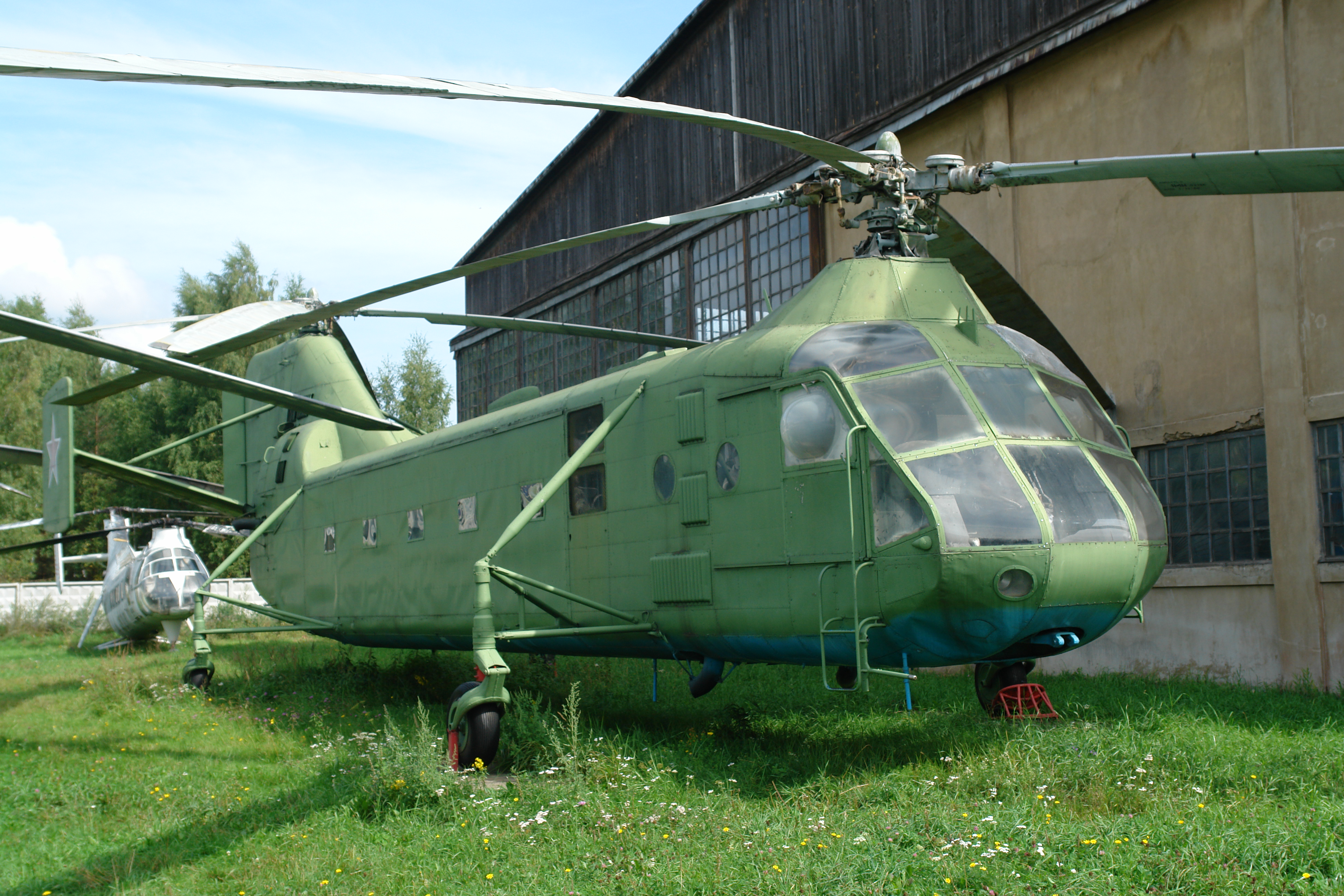
Yakovlev Yak-24 (Horse)

Other aircraft

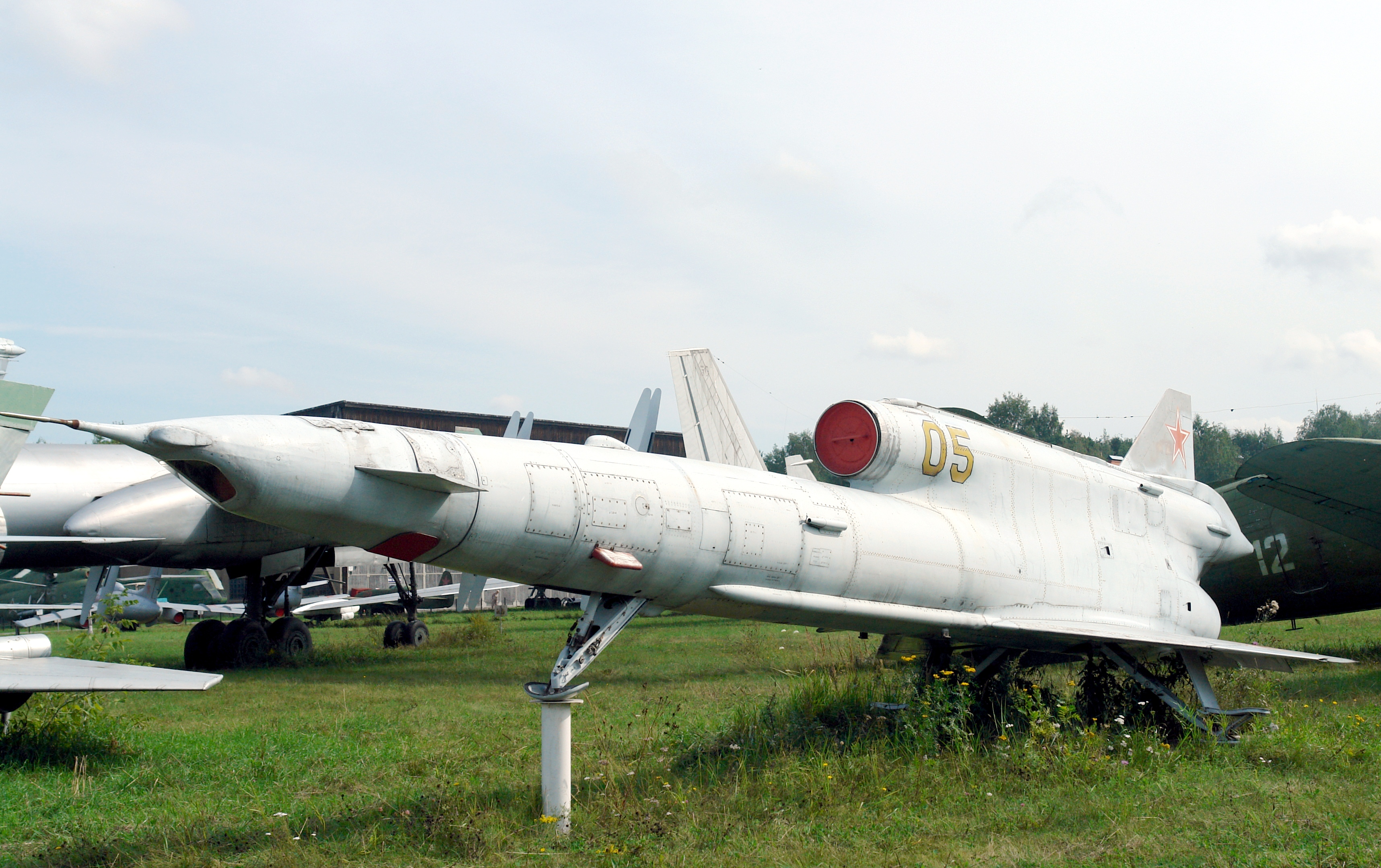
Myasishchev M-141 ("Strizh" Russian: Стриж) UAV

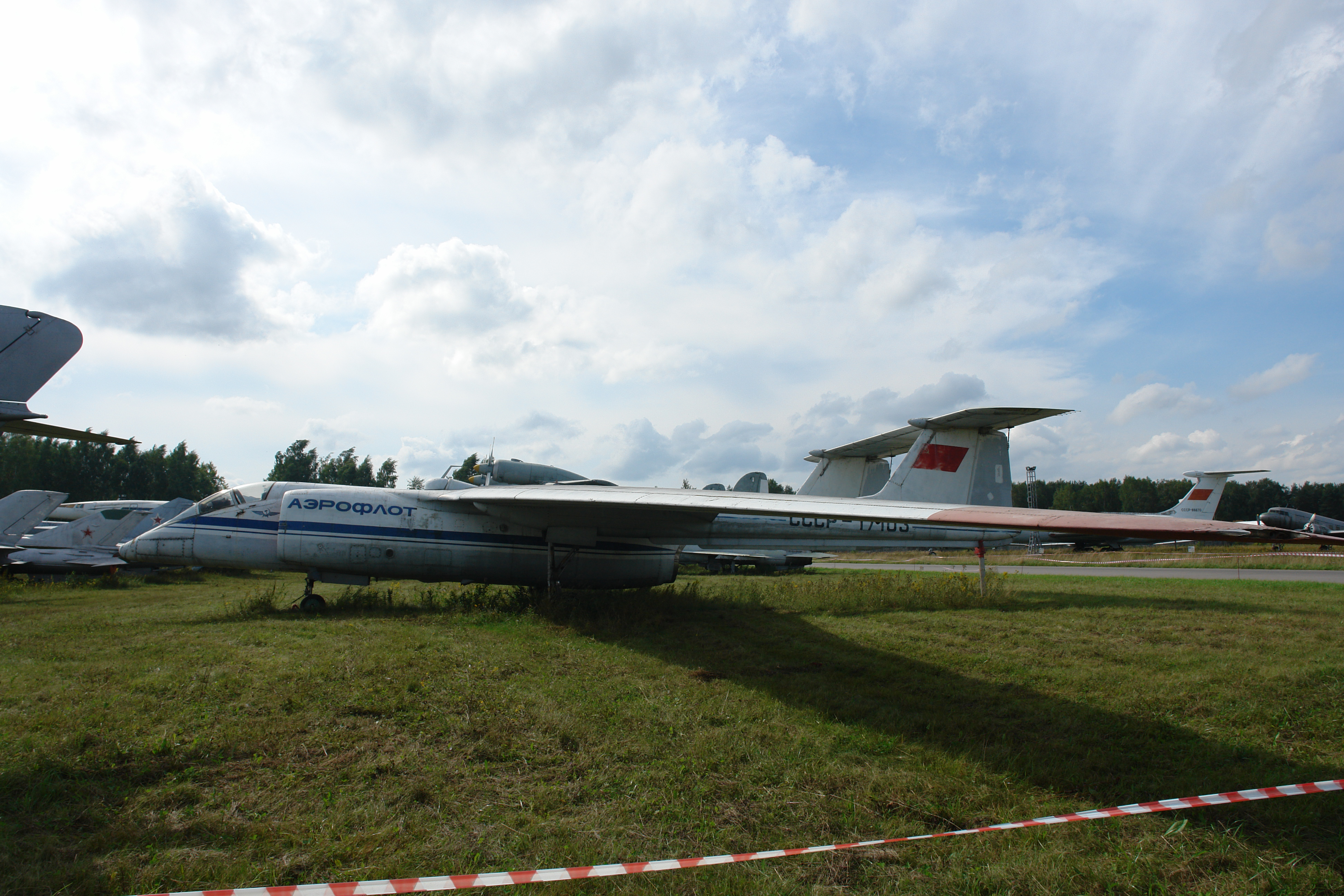
Myasishchev M-17 (Mystic) Experimental High-Altitude Aircraft

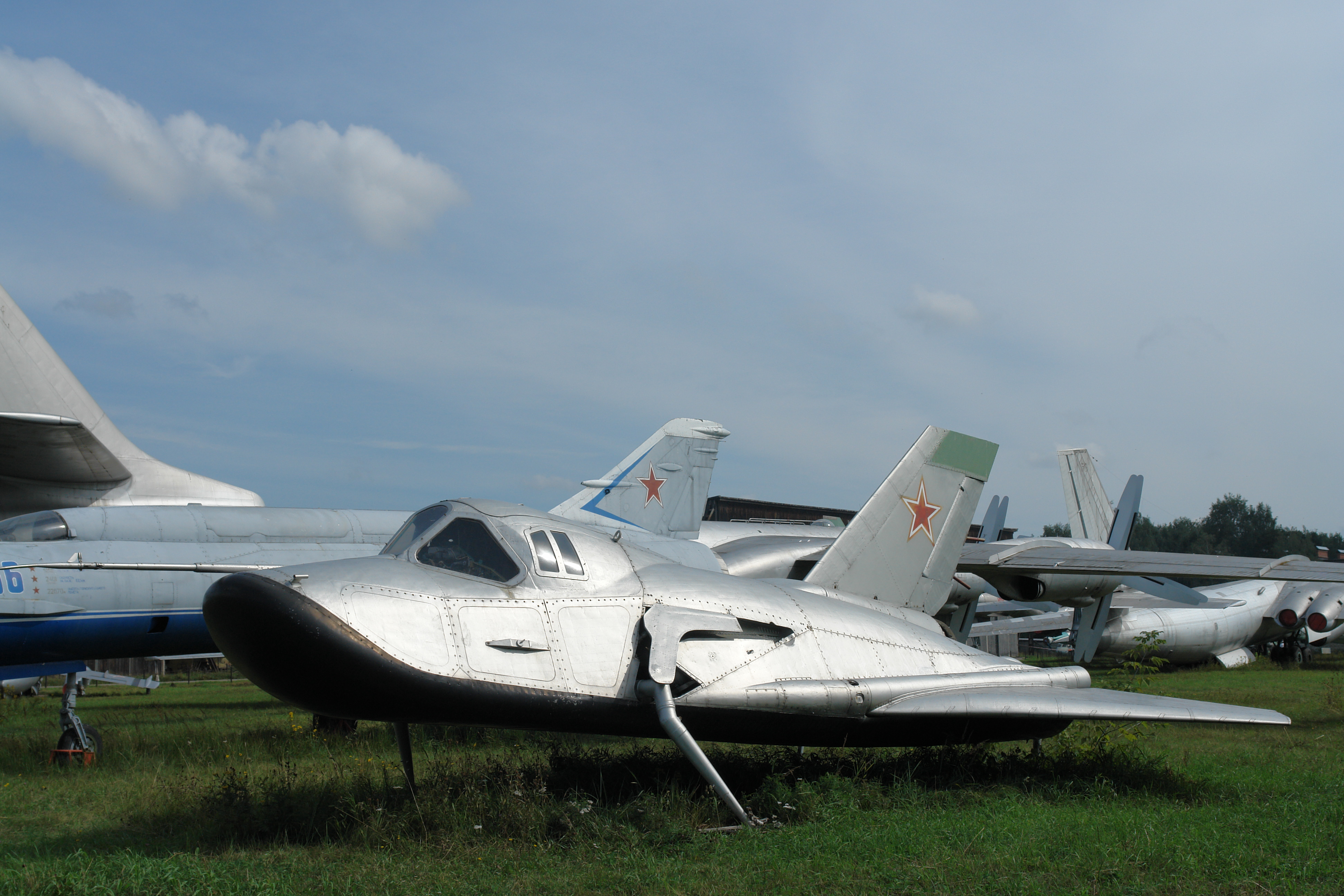
MiG-105 Spiral EPOS Orbital Spacecraft (OS) Prototype Nr. 11 (sub-sonic)

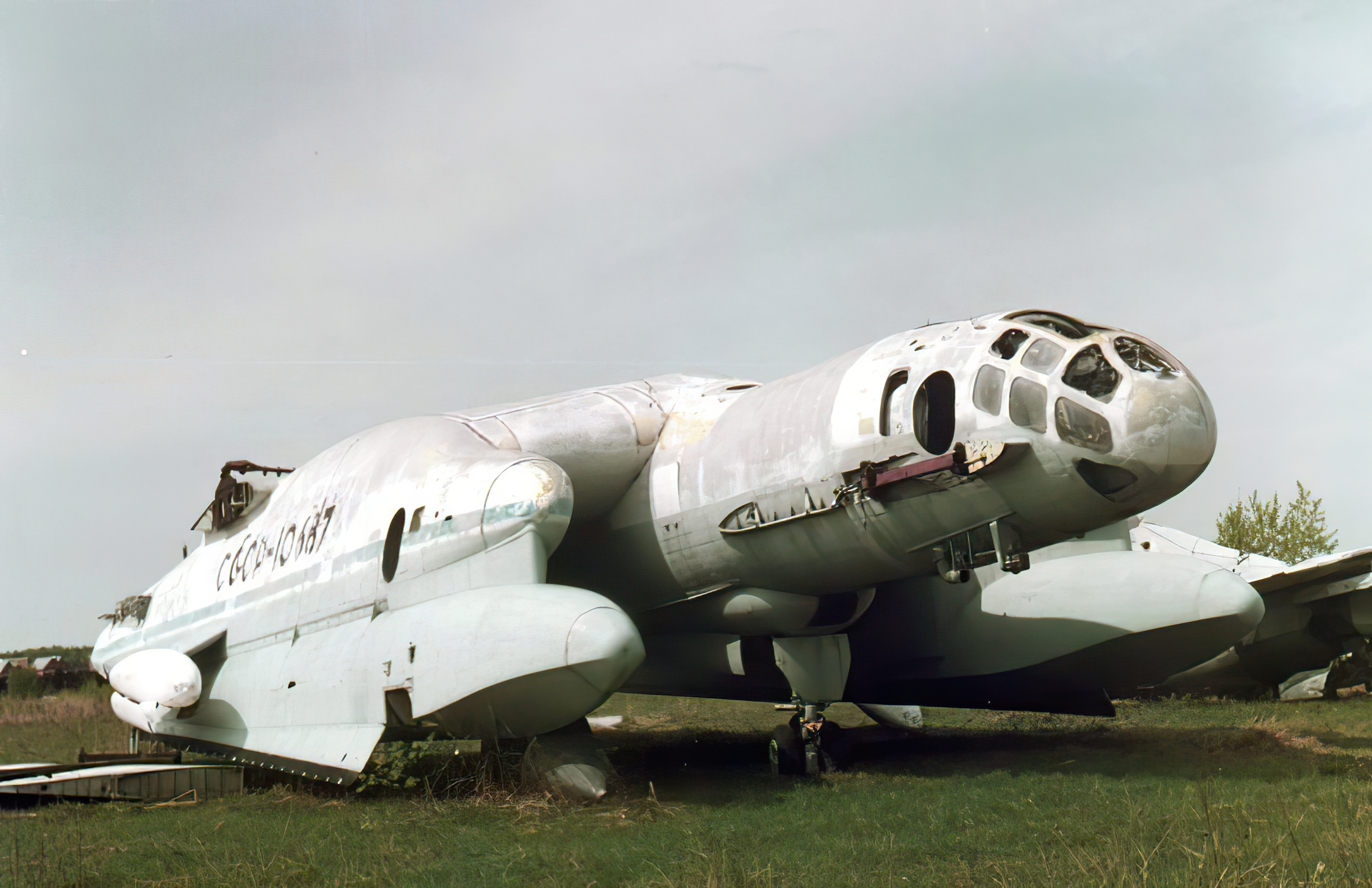
Beriev Bartini VVA-14 Vertical take-off amphibious aircraft prototype

== See also ==
- List of aerospace museums
- Ryazan Museum of Long-Range Aviation
