= Dyagilevo air base =

Military airport in Ryazan Oblast, Russia

Dyagilevo Ryazan/Dyagilevo
- авиабаза Дягилево
- Ryazan, Ryazan Oblast in Russia
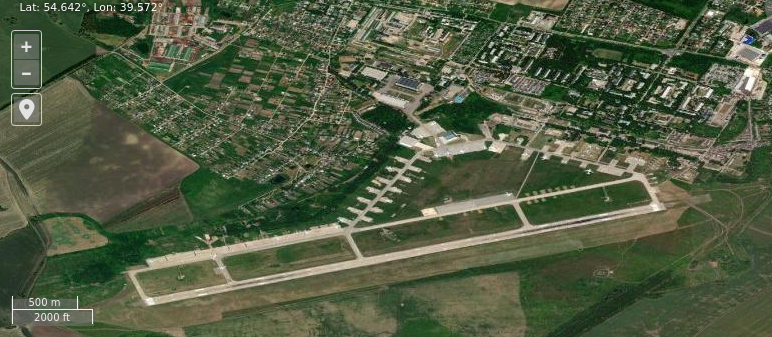
- Satellite imagery of Dyagilevo air base

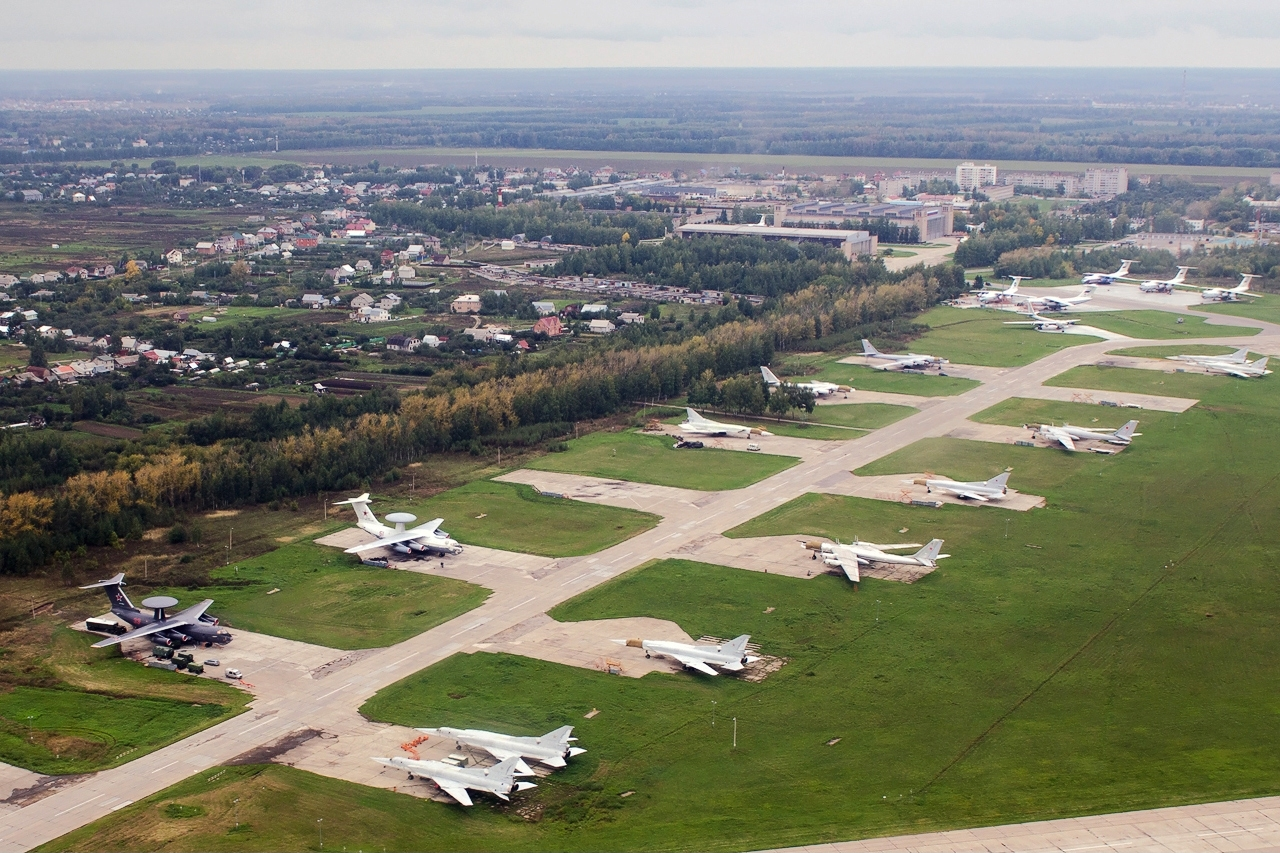
- Aircraft at Dyagilevo air base

Site information
- Type: Air Base
- Owner: Ministry of Defence
- Operator: Russian Aerospace Forces
- Controlled by: Long-Range Aviation

Location
- Shown within Ryazan Oblast Dyagilevo (Russia)
- Coordinates: 54°38′30″N 39°34′18″E

Site history
- In use: present

Airfield information
- Elevation: 134 metres (440 ft) AMSL
Runways
| Direction | Length and surface |
|---|---|
| 06/24 | 3,000 metres (9,843 ft) Concrete |

Dyagilevo (also given as Dyagilevo, Ryazan Dyagilevo) is a military air base in Ryazan Oblast, Russia, 3 km west of Ryazan. It serves as a training center for Russia's strategic bomber force.

As of 2022, the base was home to the 203rd Guards Orlovsky Independent Aircraft-refuelling Aviation Regiment with the Ilyushin Il-78/78M and the 49th Instructor Red Banner Heavy Bomber Aviation Regiment as part of the 43rd Guards Oryol Center for Combat Employment and Retraining of Long-Range Aviation Flight Personnel.

The Ryazan Museum of Long-Range Aviation is located on the base.

== History ==
In 1955 it was one of only six Soviet bases capable of handling the Myasishchev M-4 bomber. In 1967 it had seven Tupolev Tu-22s used for training.

In 1973 it received 2 Tupolev Tu-22M (NATO: Backfire) aircraft. It was also home to 43 TsBPiPLS (43rd Center for Combat Application and Training of Air Crew) which included the Tu-22M, Tupolev Tu-95 (NATO: Bear), and Tupolev Tu-134UBL (NATO: Crusty) trainer. In 1985 the 49 TBAP (49th Heavy Bomber Aviation Regiment) arrived at Dyagilevo, flying Tu-22M and Tu-95 aircraft and eventually converting into an ITBAP (training regiment). The 49th Regiment was part of the 43rd Centre, and eventually disbanded in 1997.

Following the dissolution of the Soviet Union, the Russian Air Force took command of the base. By 1994 it received 24 Tu-95K (Bear-G) bombers for decommissioning under the START II treaty. A number of Tu-16, Tu-22, and M-4 aircraft are mothballed here.

As of 2009, the ww2.dk website reported that three units were active at the airbase.

- 1st Instructor Heavy Bomber Aviation Squadron (Tu-22M3 and Tu-134)
- 2nd Instructor Heavy Bomber Aviation Squadron (Tu-95MS and An-26)
- 43rd Guards Orlovskiy Center for Combat Employment and Retraining of Personnel

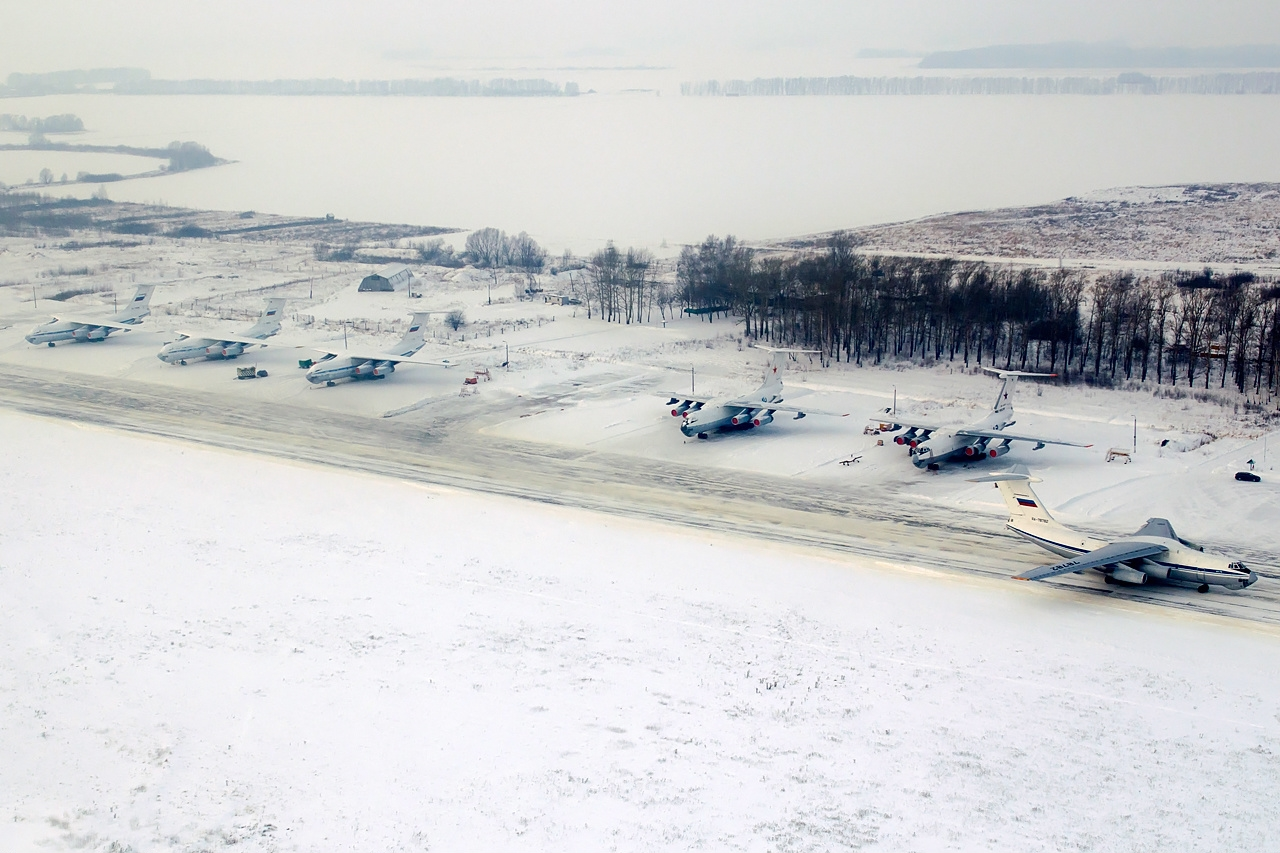
Ilyushin Il-78M at Dyagilevo

Air Power Review reported in 2004 that the 203rd Independent Orel Air Regiment of Guards (Air Tankers) operating Il-78 and Il-78M was stationed at the base. Formed 6 July 1941 at Monino near Moscow as the 412th Aviation Regiment, with TB-7 (Pe-8) heavy bombers. Renamed 432nd AP several weeks later. Renamed 25th AP DD of Guards 19 September 1943. 1230th AP (SZ) renamed 203rd OAP (SZ) 1 December 1994.

On 5 December 2022, the base was attacked by Ukrainian drones which damaged a Tu-22M3 bomber and destroyed a fuel truck; three personnel were killed and five injured. The Engels Air Force Base was also raided on the same night. On 14 December, a Shahed-136 drone that exploded in a Kyiv apartment building had “For Ryazan“ written on it in Russian.

By December 2022, the 360 Aircraft Repair Factory (360 ARZ) located at the base was placed under sanctions of the European Union and USA due to the Russian invasion of Ukraine.

On 1 June 2025, as part of Operation Spider's Web, Ukraine attacked Dyagilevo and four other air bases using a swarm of short-range drones.

== See also ==
- List of military airbases in Russia
