= Ryazan Museum of Long-Range Aviation =

Aviation museum in Ryazan, Russia

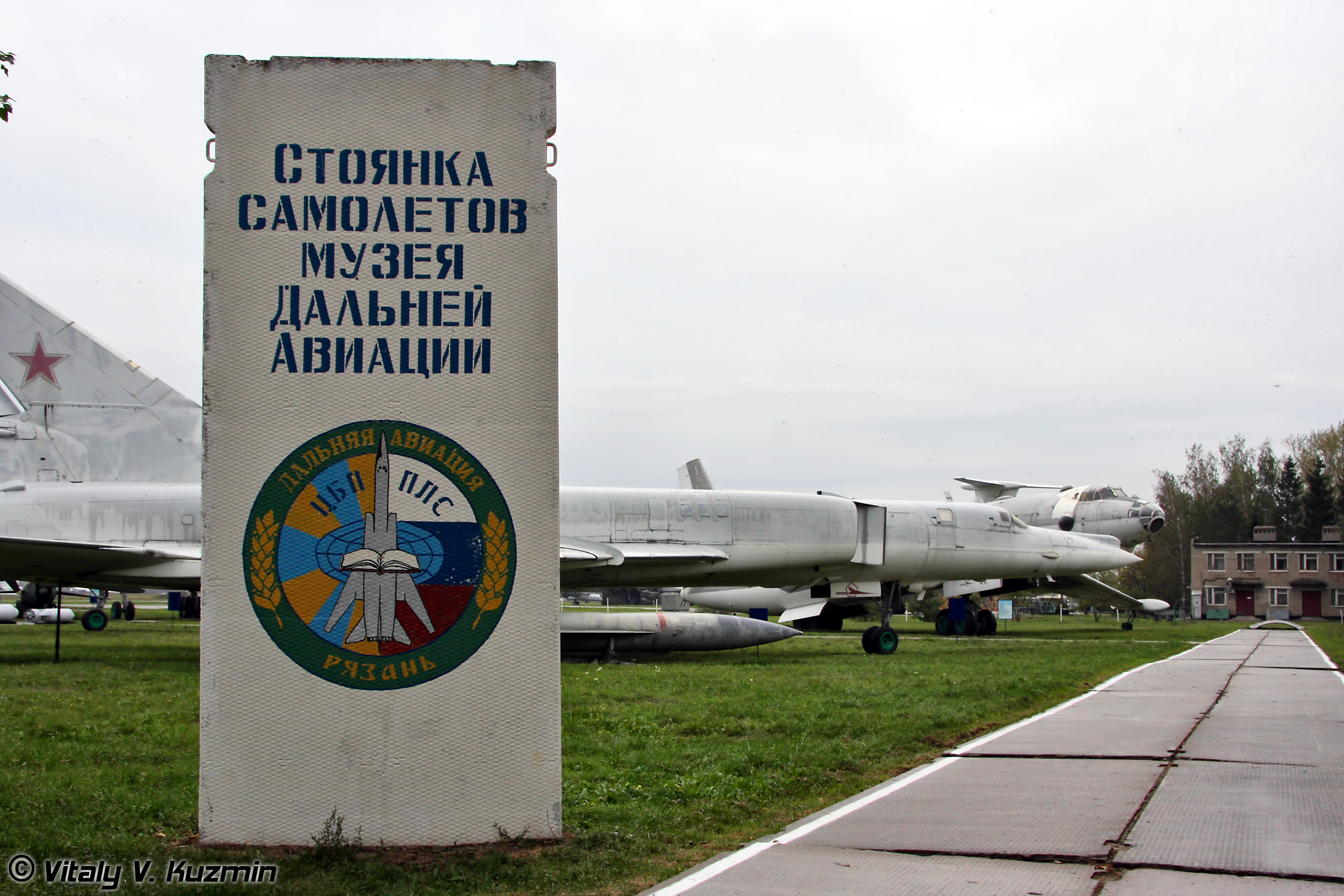
Entrance to the Ryazan Museum of Long-Range Aviation

Ryazan Museum of Long-Range Aviation (Russian: Рязанский музей дальней авиации) is a Russian thematic museum and exhibition complex located on the territory of the 43rd Air Force Flight Training and Retraining Center at Dyagilevo air base, Ryazan. Exposition of the complex combines a large number of objects related to the history of the development and use of military aviation in the USSR and the Russian Federation. It includes domestic combat aircraft, samples of their weapons and equipment, military uniforms, equipment, personal belongings and awards to outstanding pilots. It also includes documents, maps, photographs, etc. Over the years the museum has conducted more than 6,000 tours, and the number of visitors has exceeded 120,000 people.

== History ==
The museum was created on the initiative of Lieutenant Colonel Yuli Nikolayevich Yermakov, an instructor of the 43rd Military Training Center. The opening of the museum complex took place on April 29, 1975.

In accordance with the Directive of the Minister of Defence of the Russian Federation dated June 4, 2009, D-024, in the course of optimization of the organizational structure of military units, the Long-Range Aviation Museum was no longer part of the 43rd Combat Training Center, and its employees were dismissed. Nevertheless, the Long-Range Aviation Museum has continued to operate on a voluntary basis.

== Gallery ==
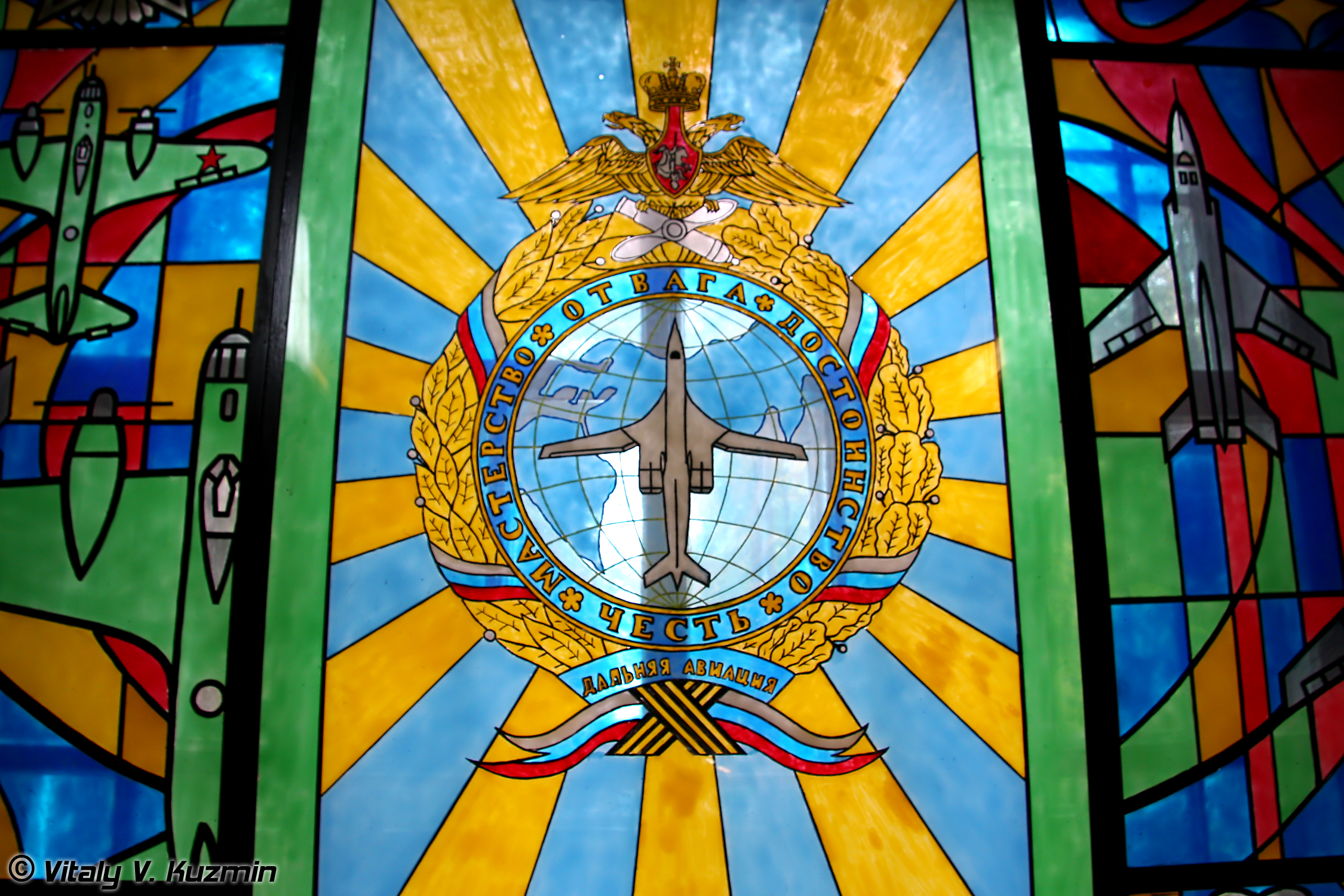
Painted windows at the entrance to the museum

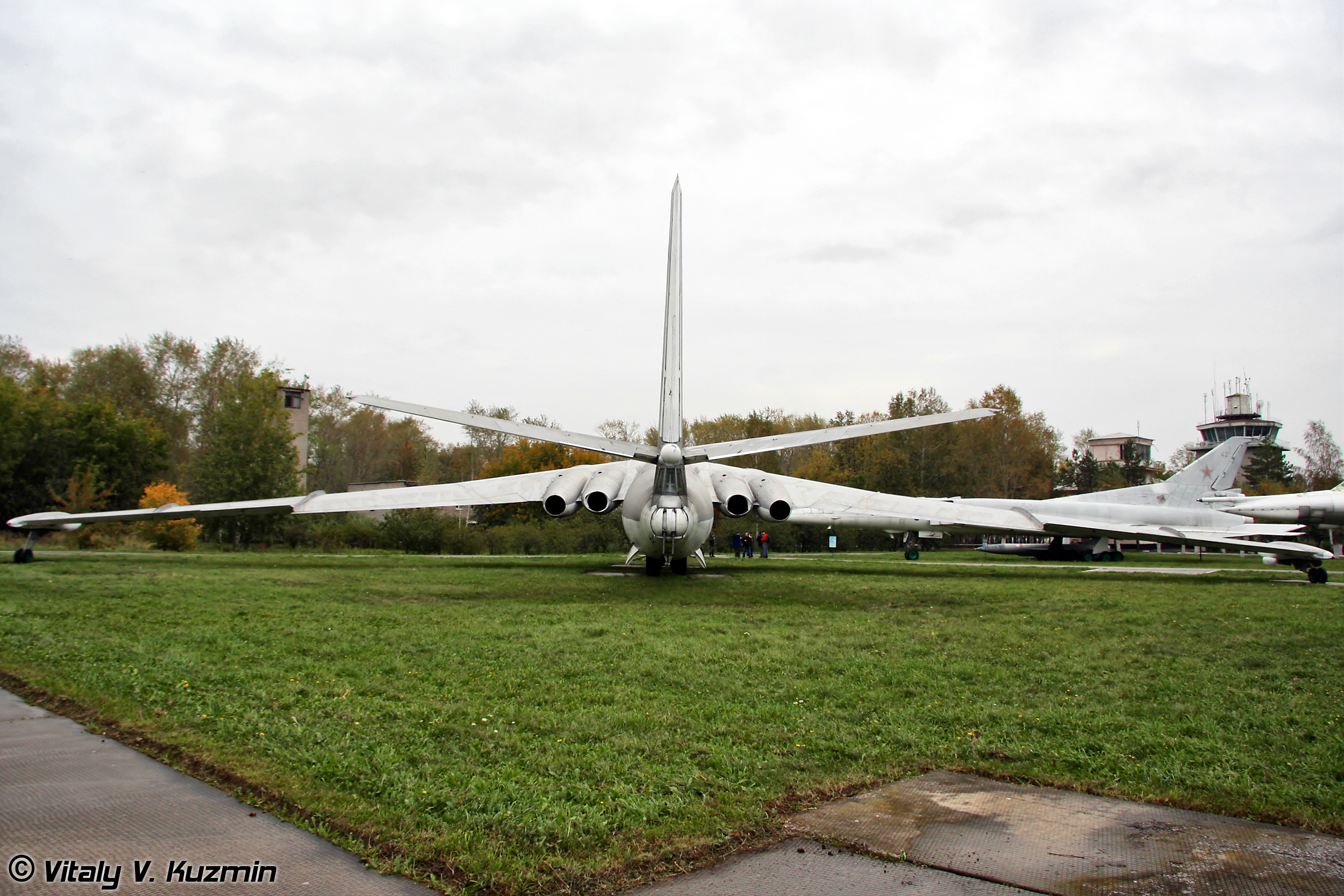
M-4-2 tanker aircraft

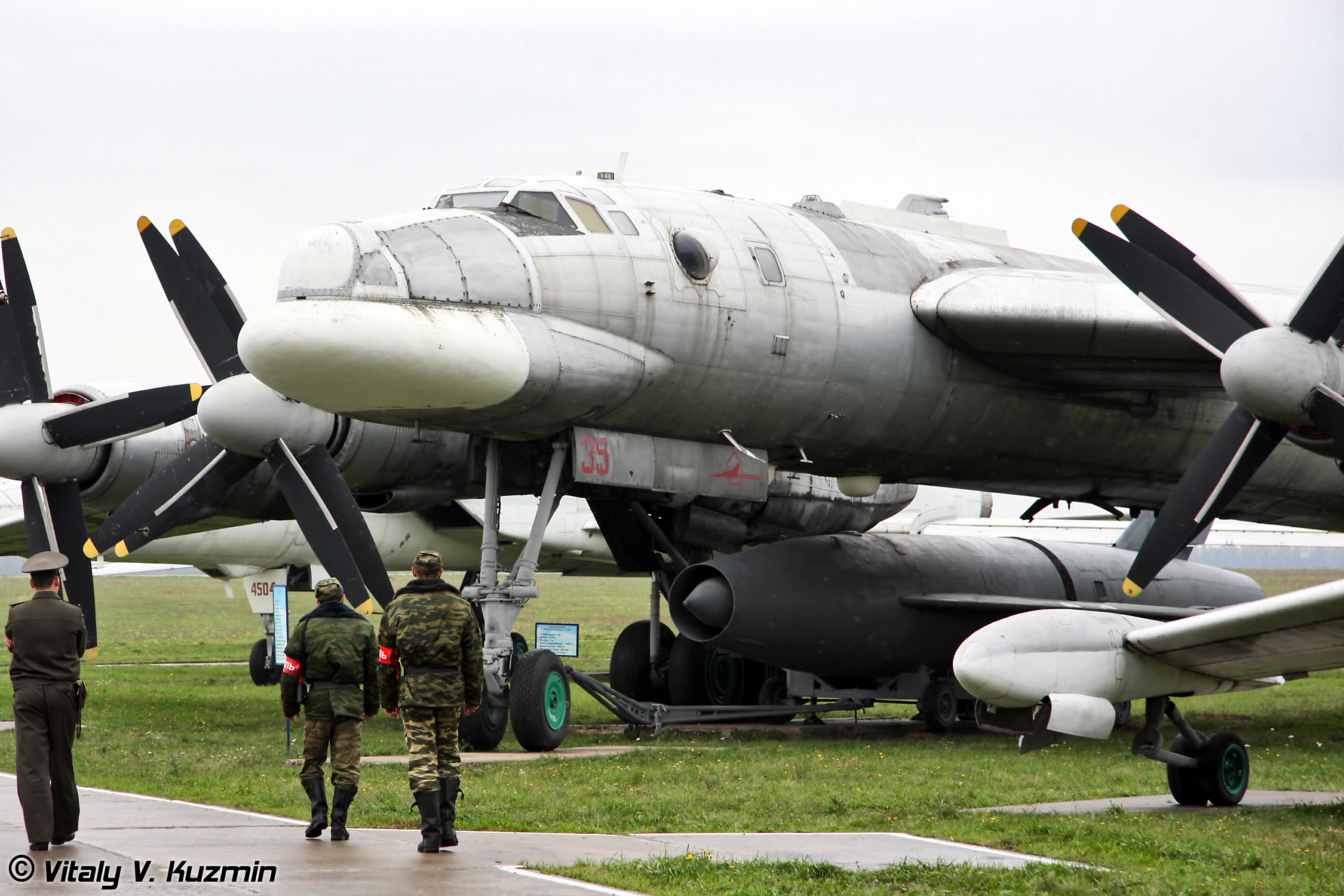
Tu-95K-20

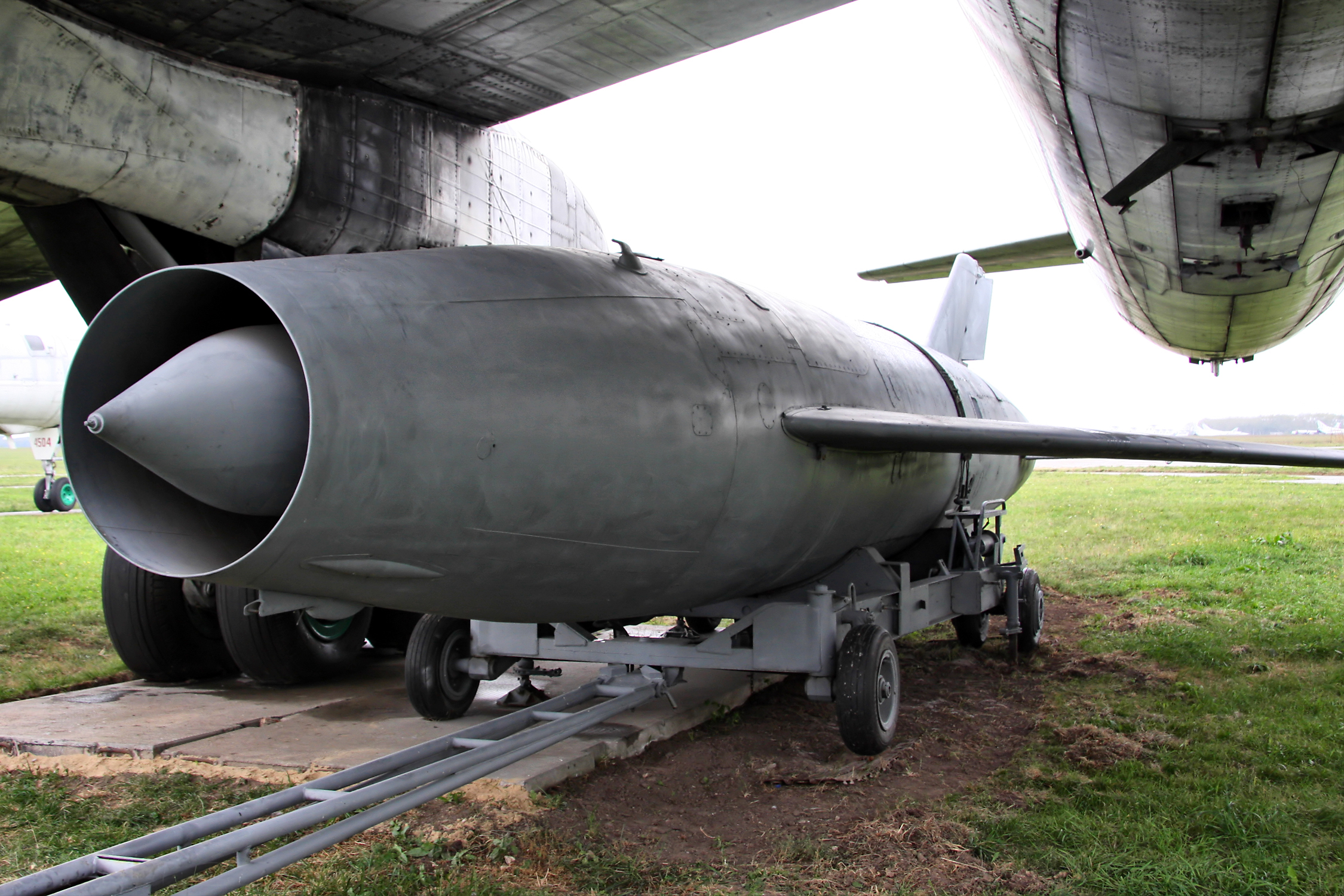
Aviation cruise missile Kh-20M

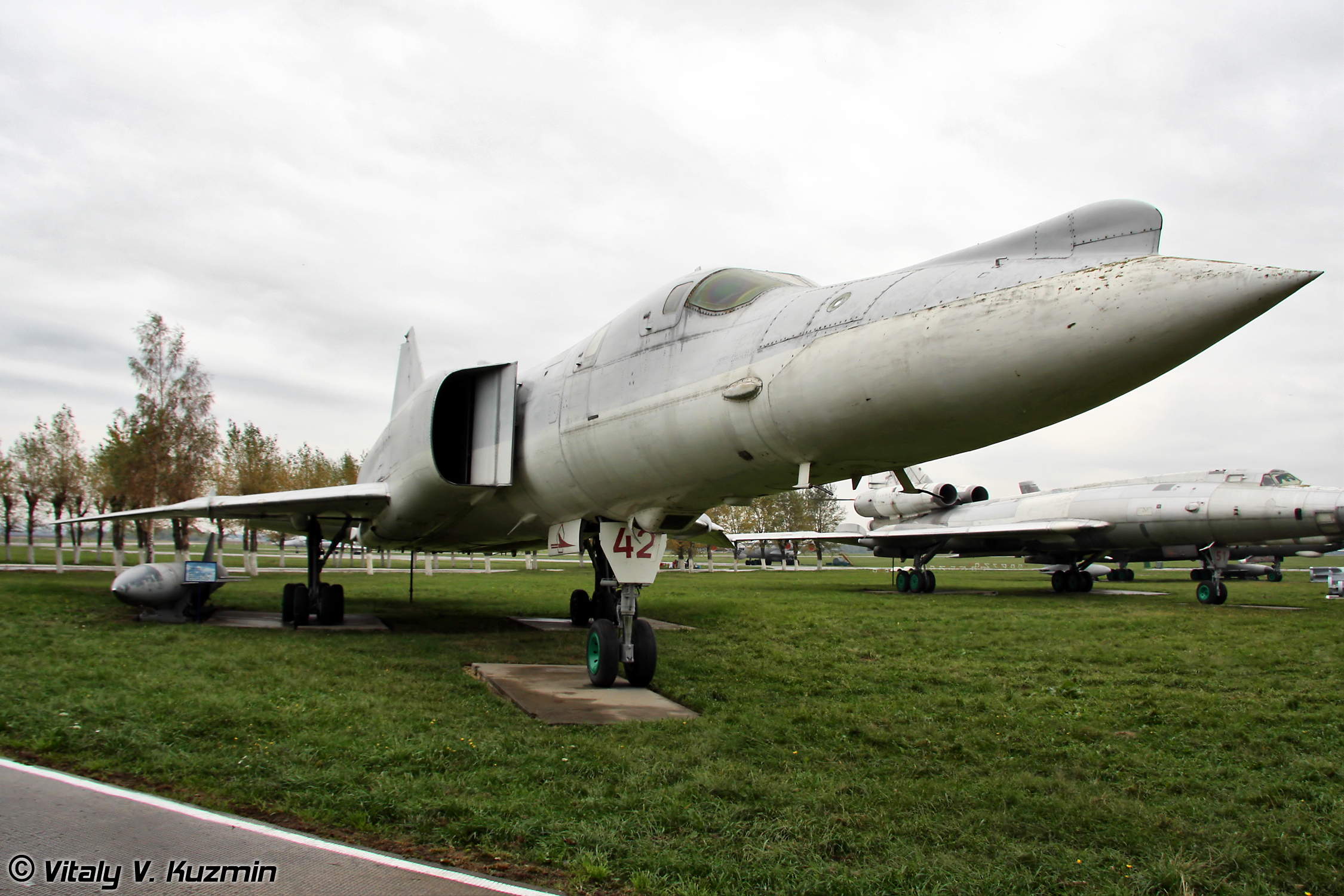
Tu-22M2

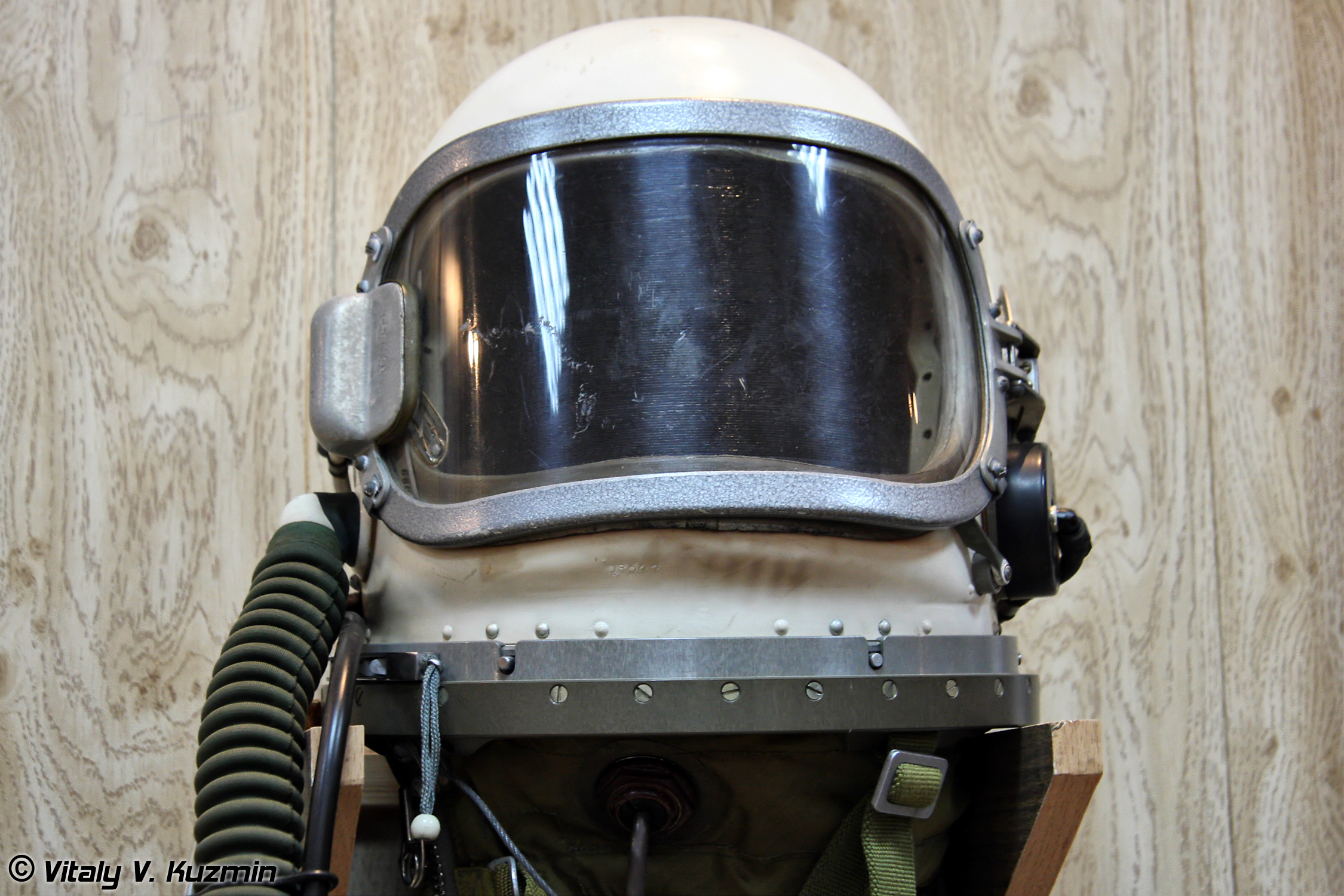
Hermetic Helmet of the Army General Pyotr Deynekin

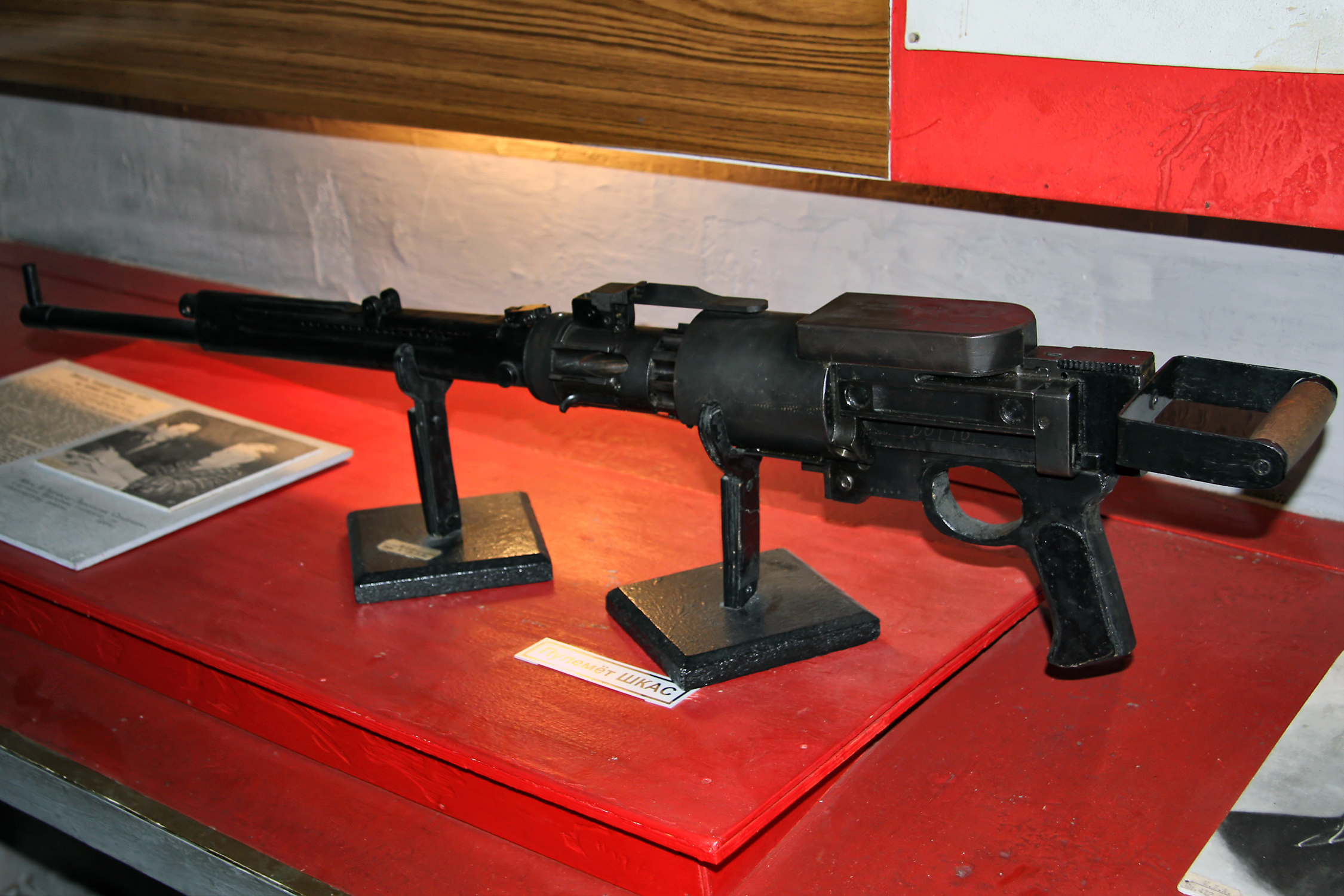
The first 7.62mm Soviet high-speed aviation machine gun ShKAS

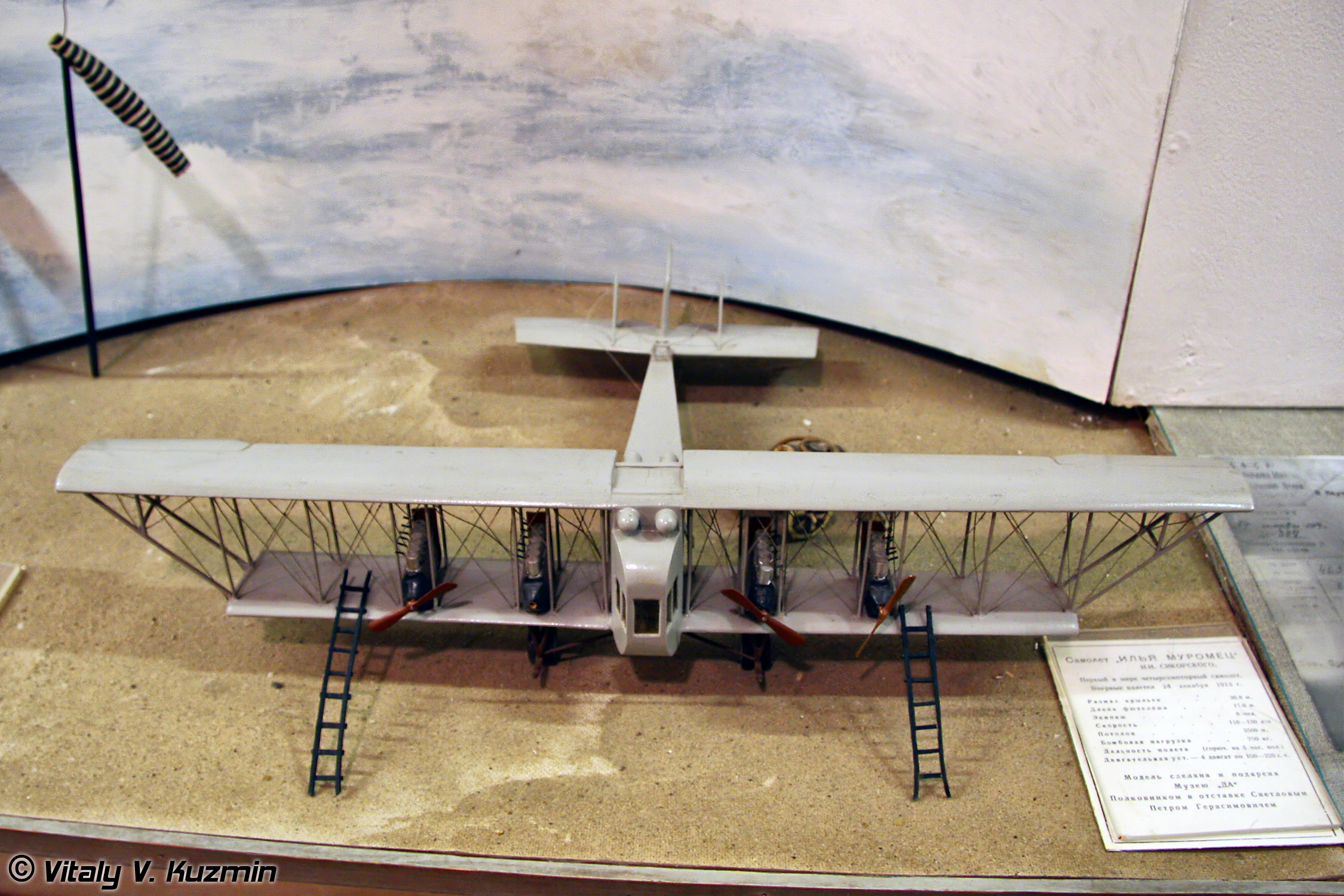
Aircraft model "Ilya Muromets" developed by Igor Sikorsky

== See also ==
- Poltava Museum of Long-Range and Strategic Aviation
- Poltava-4
- Ukrainian Long Range Aviation
- Operation Frantic
- Ukraine State Aviation Museum
- Aviation Technical Museum (Lugansk)
