= Ukrainian Long Range Aviation =

Former Ukrainian military command (1992-2006)

Long Range Aviation Group of the Armed Forces of Ukraine
- Авіаційна група дальньої авіації Збройних сил України
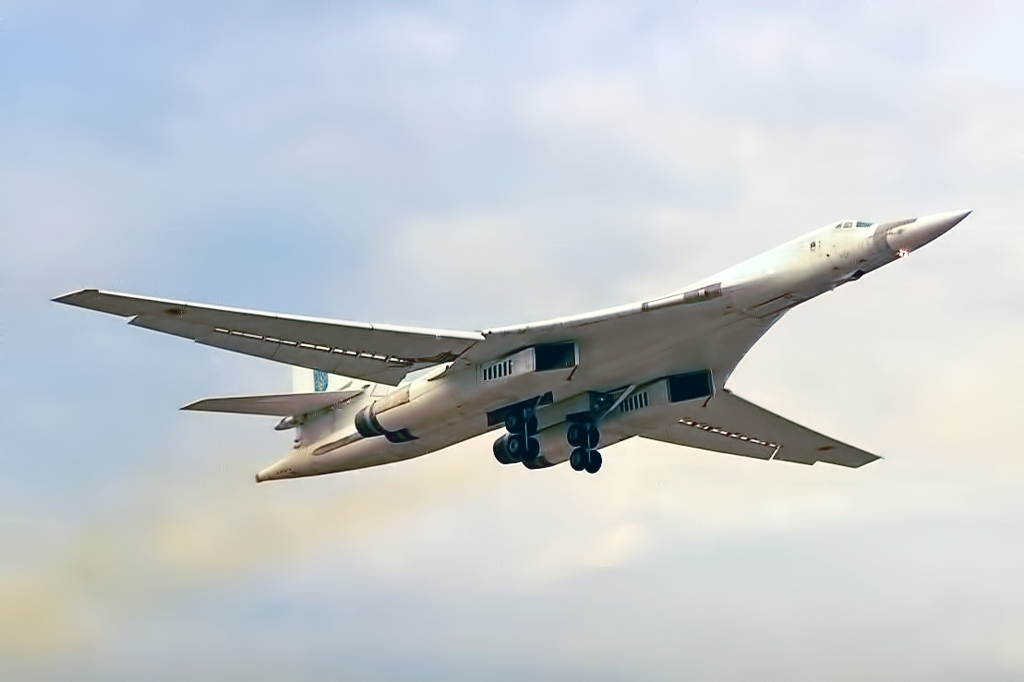
- A Tu-160 in Ukrainian colours, 1997.
- Founded: 1992
- Disbanded: 2007
- Country: Ukraine
- Type: Major Command
- Part of: Ukraine Air Force
- Headquarters: Uzyn (air base)
- Equipment: 189 aircraft

Commanders
- First commander: Major general Mykhailo Bashkirov

Insignia
- Roundel

- Fin flash

Aircraft flown
- Bomber: Tu-22KD, Tu-16, Tu-22M3, Tu-95MS, Tu-160
- Trainer: Tu-22UD, Tu-134UBL
- Transport: Il-78

The Long Range Aviation Group (Ukrainian: Авіаційна група дальньої авіації, Aviaciyna Grupa Dalnoi Aviacii); abbr. AGDA / АГДА), was a military organisation, subordinate to the Central High Command of the Ukrainian Air Force, which included the long-range aircraft of Ukraine. It was the Ukrainian successor to the Long Range Aviation sub-branch of the Soviet armed forces. It was disbanded in 2007.

== History ==
After the fall of the Soviet Union, the Ukrainian Air Force was left with three air armies (1,100 combat aircraft), which included 30 Tu-16 missile carriers, 33 Tu-22KD missile carriers, 30 Tu-22R reconnaissance aircraft, 36 Tu-22M3s, 23 Tu-95MSs, 19 Tu-160s, 20 Ilyushin IL-78 aerial refueling aircraft, as well as large stockpiles of missiles: 1,068 Kh-55s and 423 Kh-22s.

In 1992 Ukraine also received much of the Soviet Black Sea Fleet, including the 2nd Guards Maritime Missile Aviation Division (Hvardiiske, Crimea), with three regiments of maritime attack Tu-22M2s and an independent Maritime Reconnaissance Aviation Regiment (Saki-Novofedorovka, Crimean Oblast) of Tu-22Ps. The 1995/96 edition of the Military Balance continued to list the remnant of these forces under now-Ukrainian Naval Aviation. In 1994 Tu-22M2s, Tu-16Ks and a large part of the Tupolev Tu-22Ps were put in storage and then dismantled.

The reasons for the elimination of Ukrainian long-range bombers included:

- The deep economic crisis in Ukraine after the collapse of the USSR
- Pressure from the U.S. State Department on Ukraine
- Lack of support from production plants and design bureaus which remained in Russia
- Reduction in the size of the armed forces resulting in the loss of experienced pilots and supporting personnel
- Life expectancy of some aircraft components and assemblies had expired

Funding for the elimination of strategic aviation of Ukraine was allocated by the U.S. government as part of an agreement "to provide assistance to Ukraine in the elimination of strategic nuclear weapons and to prevent the proliferation of weapons of mass destruction", signed on November 25, 1993 between Ukraine and the United States. In 2000 in the agreement was extended to 31 December 2006.

== Long-Range Aviation bases ==
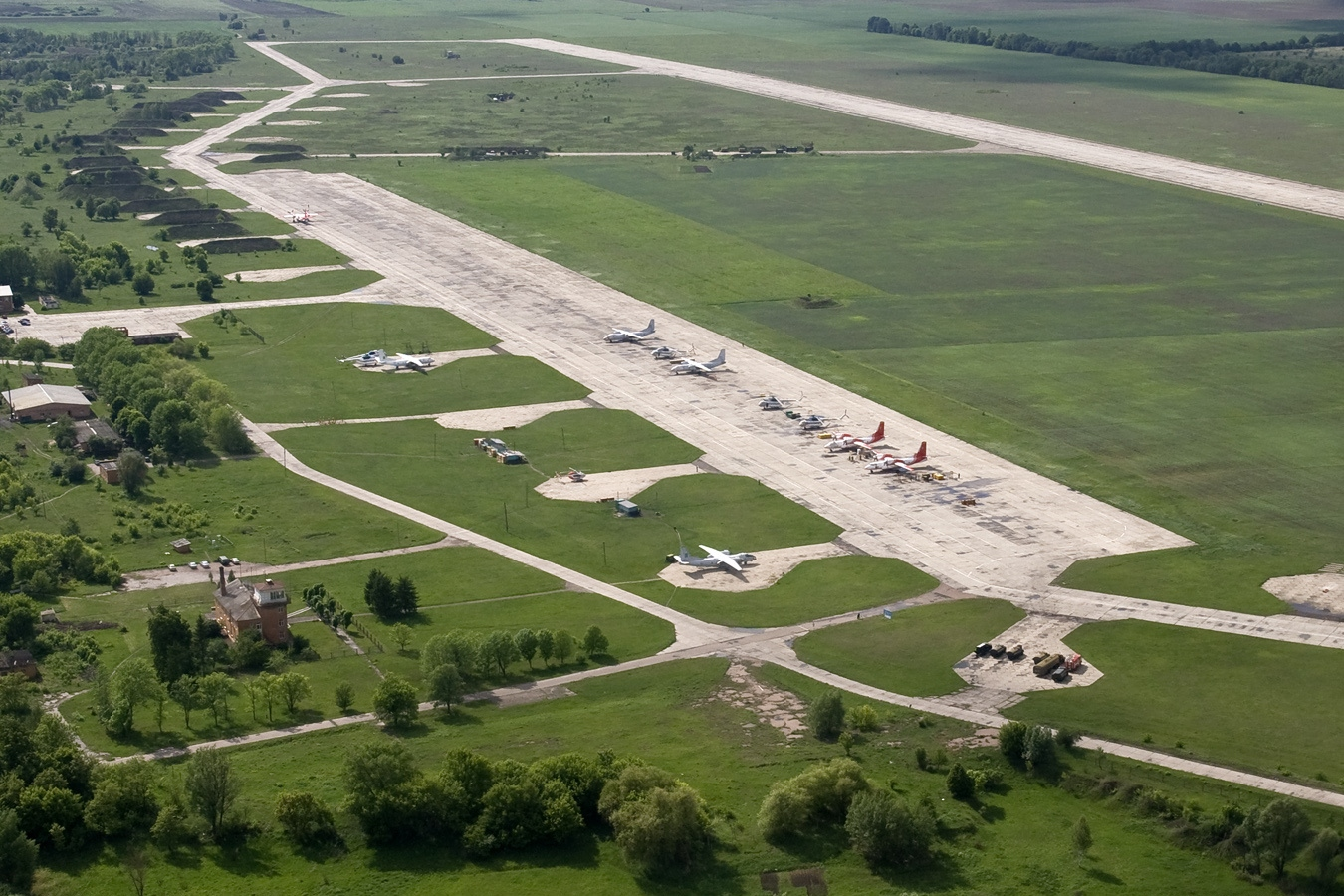
Nizhyn Air Base in 2010

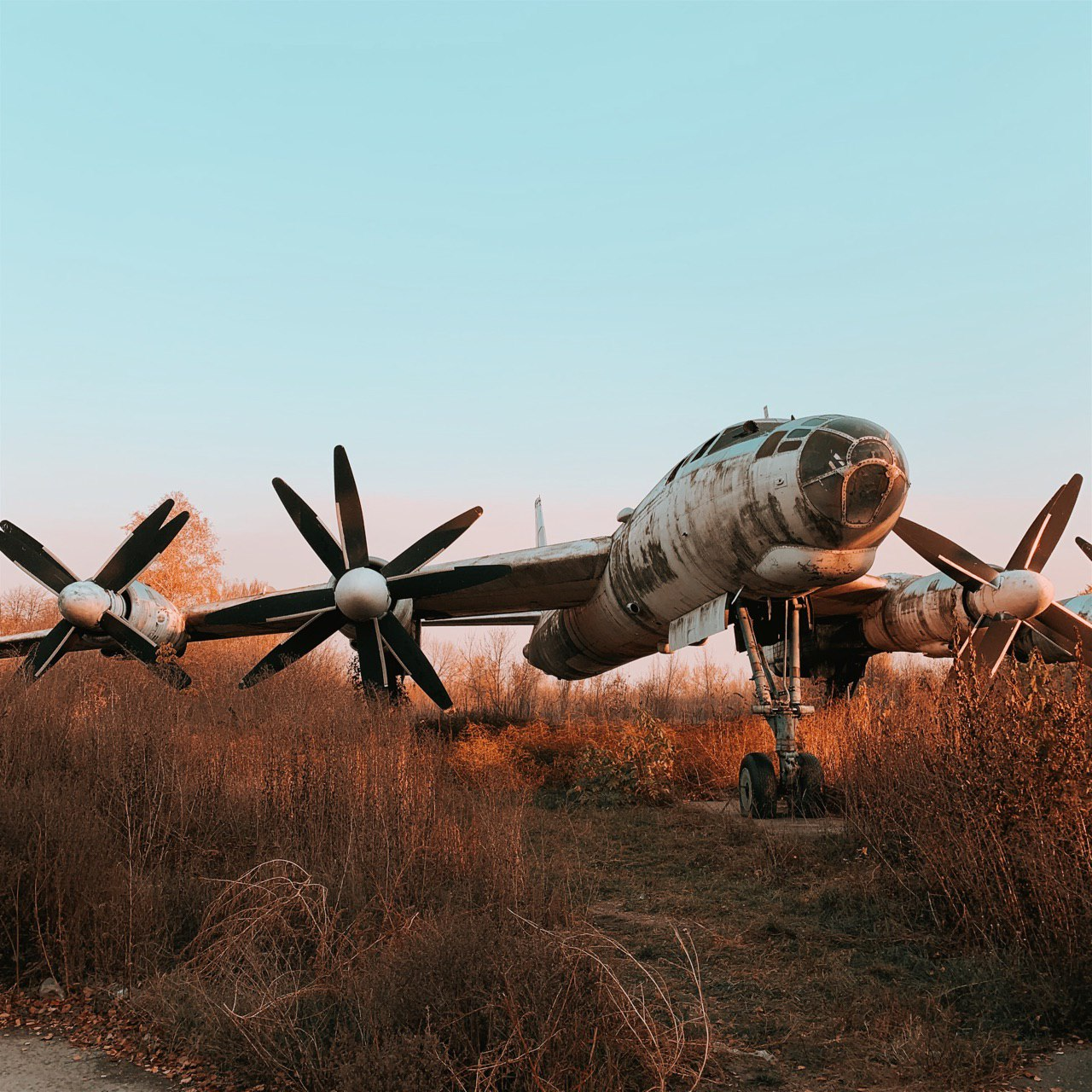
Tu-95U at Uzin Air Base in 2019

Regiment/brigade	Base	Aircraft type	Comments
251st Heavy Bomber Aviation Regiment	Bila Tserkva Air Base	27 Tu-16K	
199th Reconnaissance Aviation Regiment	Nizhyn Air Base	c. 30 Tu-22R/RDK/P/U	Last flight of the Tu-22 in July 1998. On February 22, 1999, transferred to the Ministry of Emergency Situations and renamed 300 Special Aviation Squadron MOE.
1006th Heavy Bomber Aviation Regiment	Uzyn (air base)	23 Tu-95MC	
409th Aviation Regiment of tanker aircraft	Uzyn (air base)	21 Il-78	Since 1993, some of the Il-78 were disposed of their refueling equipment and used as cargo aircraft, the other ones were sold to Algeria, India, Pakistan and China, where they are used for air refueling operations.
184th Guards Heavy Bomber Aviation Regiment	Pryluky Air Base	19 Tu-160	Unit was finally disbanded in November 2000
185th Guards Heavy Bomber Aviation Regiment	Poltava Air Base	18 Тu-22M3, 6 Tu-16P	Unit was finally disbanded in 2006. In February 2006, at the Poltava military airfield, the last Tu-22M3 bomber Ukrainian Air Force was cut. In 2007, a museum was created on the territory of the former airbase thanks to the enthusiasm of former military pilots.
341st Heavy Bomber Aviation Regiment	Ozerne Air Base	~30 Tu-22K/KP/P/U	Last flight of the Tu-22 in 1997. In 1997-1998 Tu-22 relocated to Nizhyn Air Base where all planes were cut by 2001.
260th Heavy Bomber Aviation Regiment	Stryi Air Base	18 Tu-22M3, 23 Tu-16K	In 1993, the regiment was disbanded, Tu-22M3 relocated to Pryluky Air Base, and Tu-16 withdrawn from service.

== Gallery ==
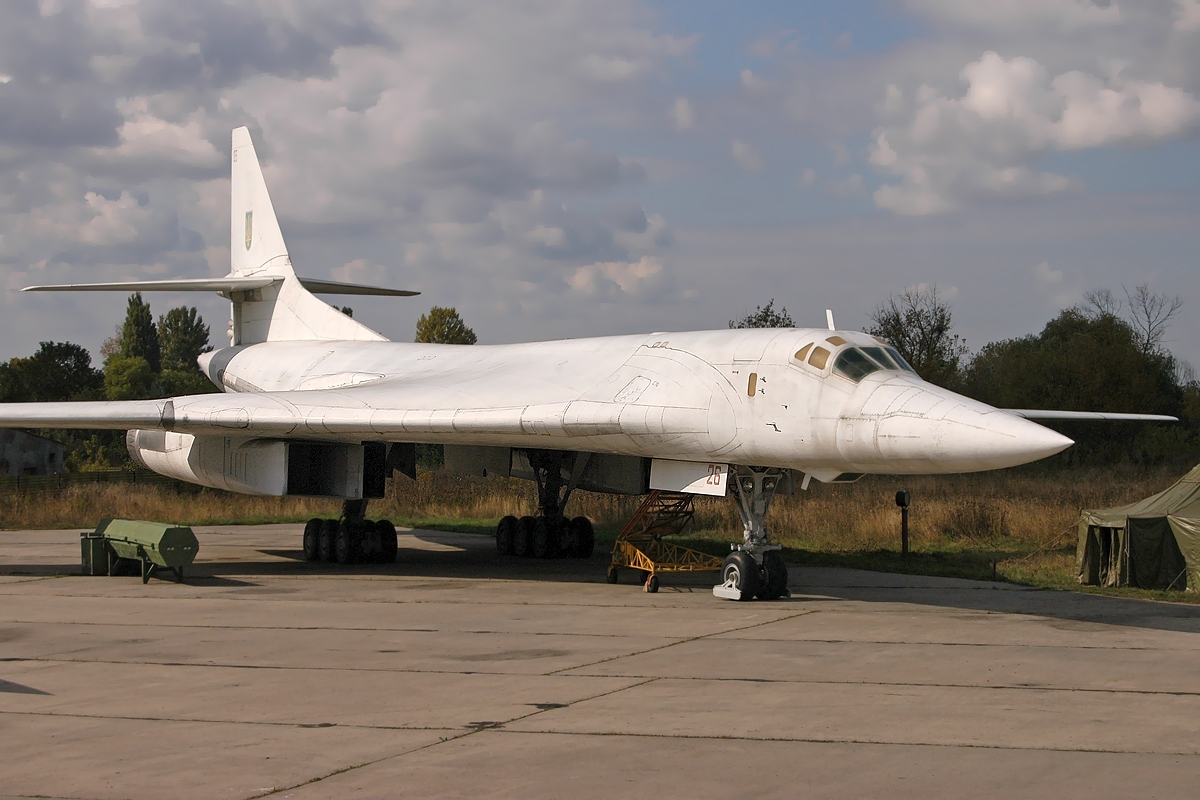
Tu-160 from 184th Guards Heavy Bomber Aviation Regiment at Poltava Air Base

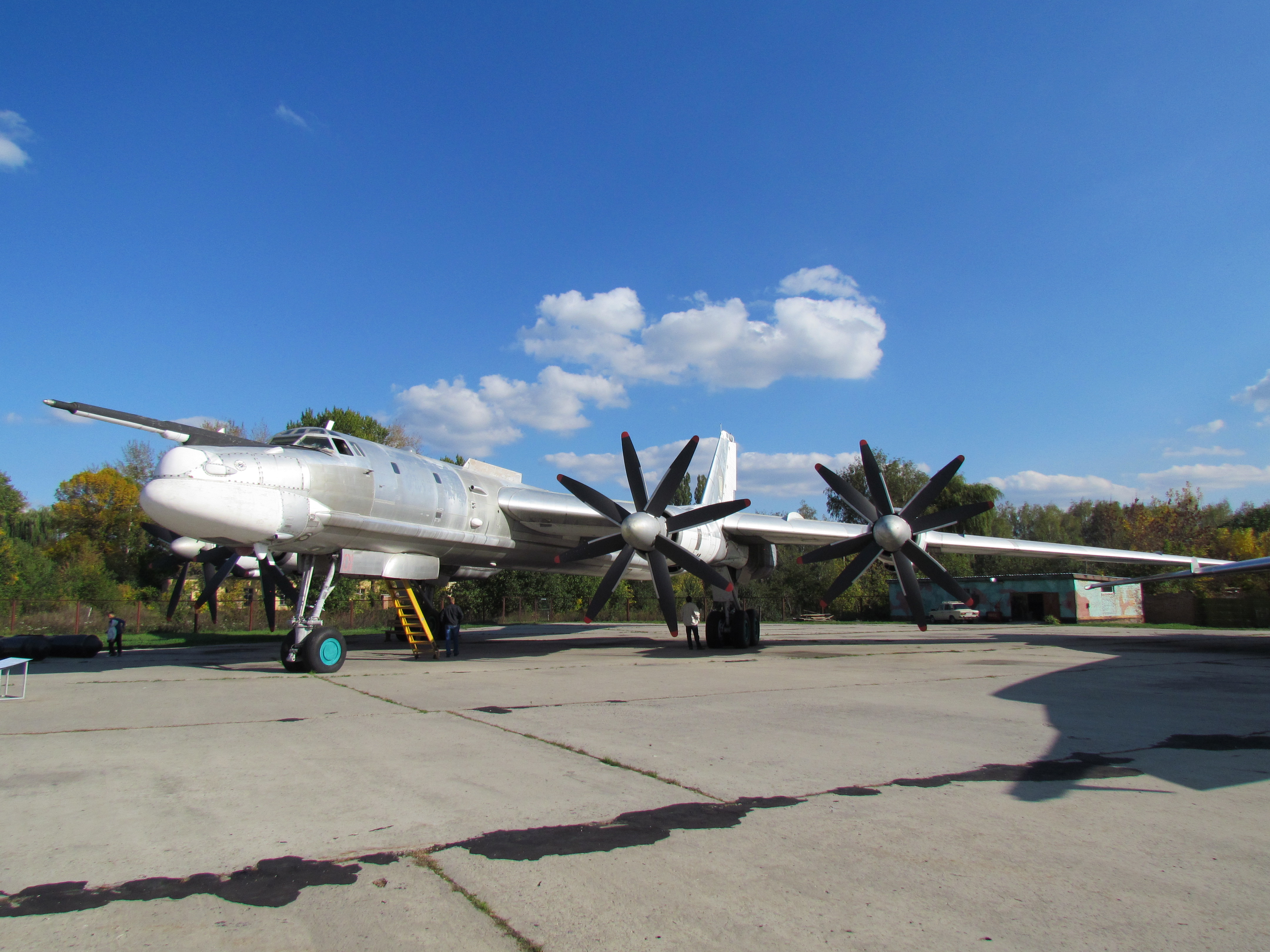
Tu-95MS

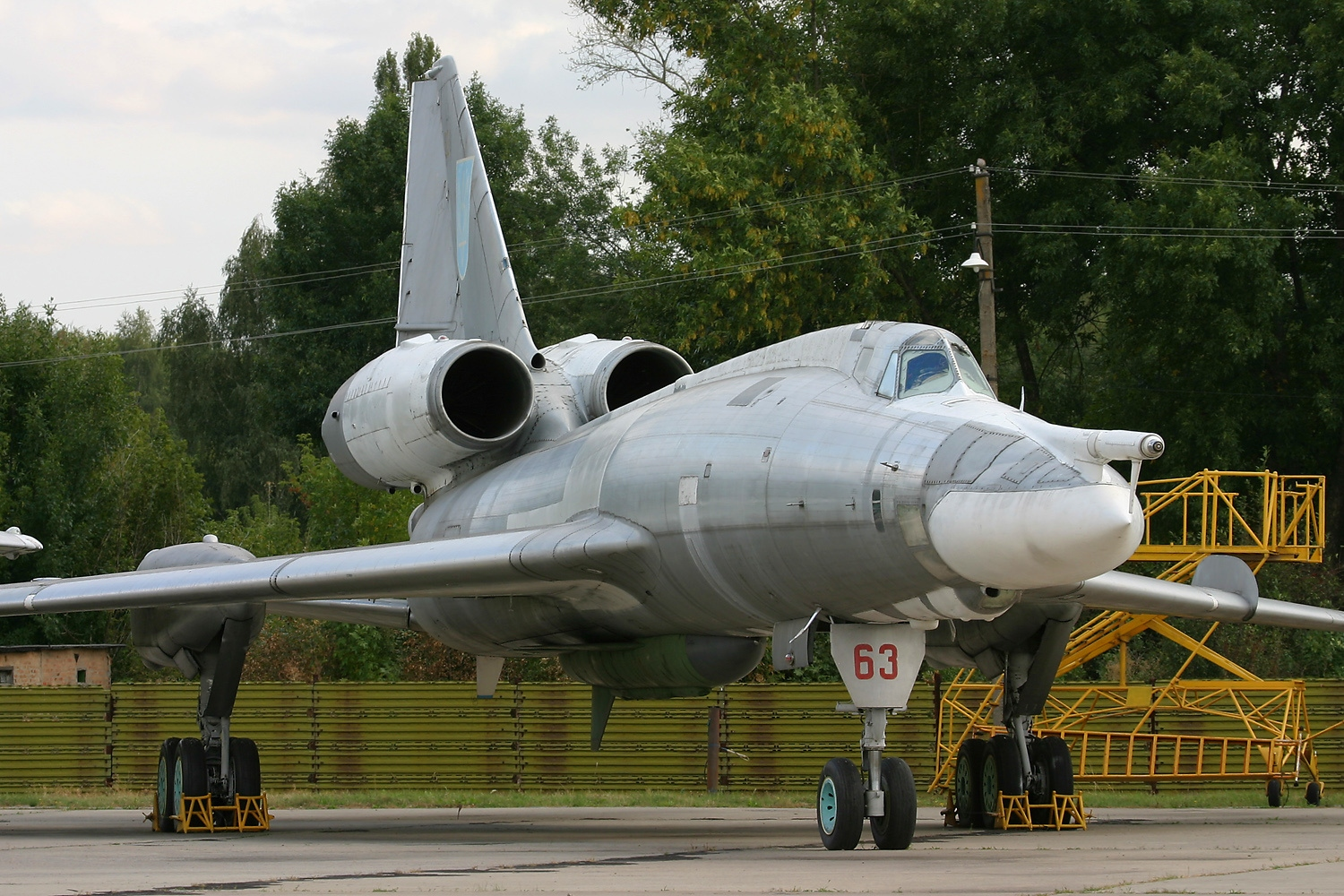
Tu-22KD

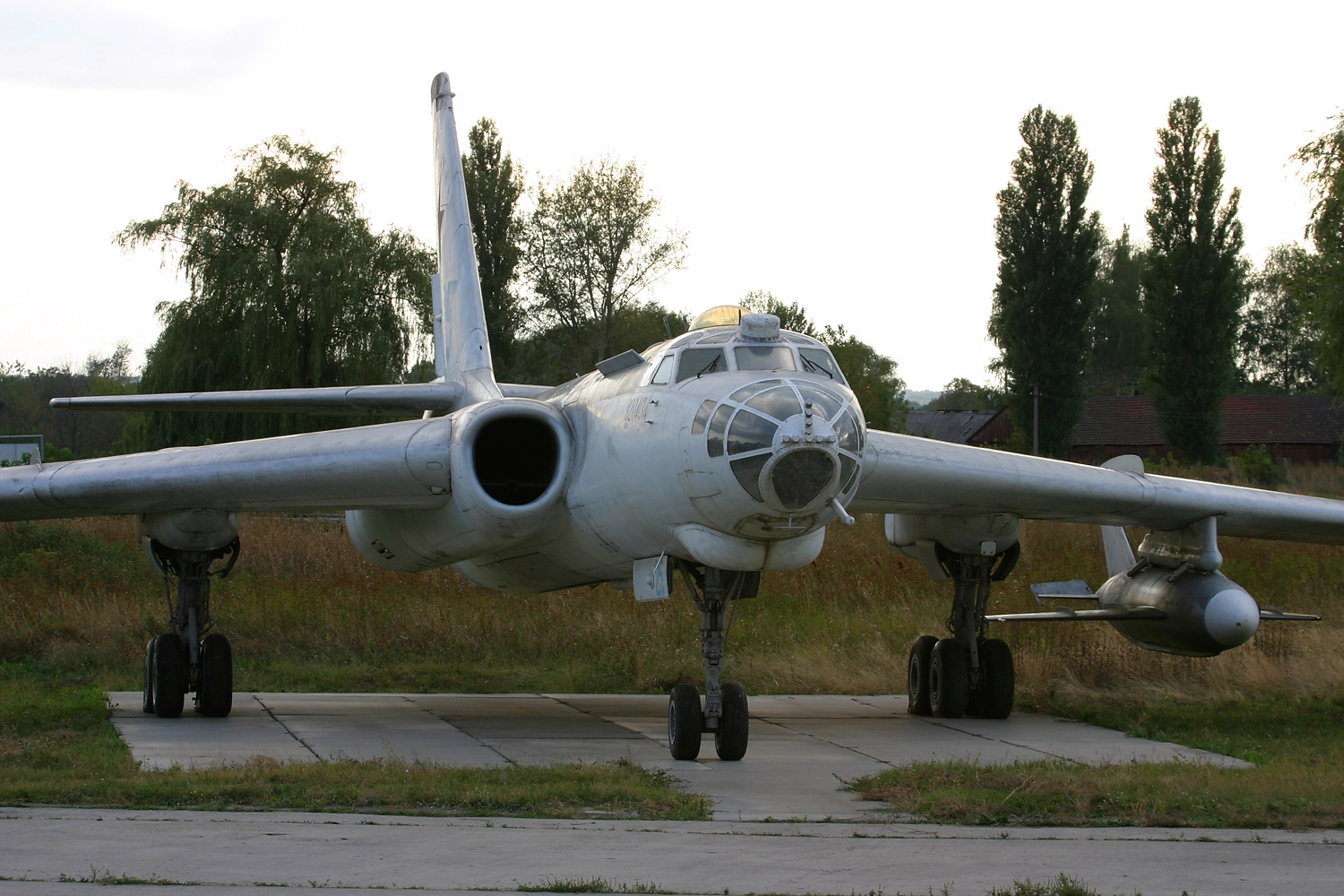
Tu-16K

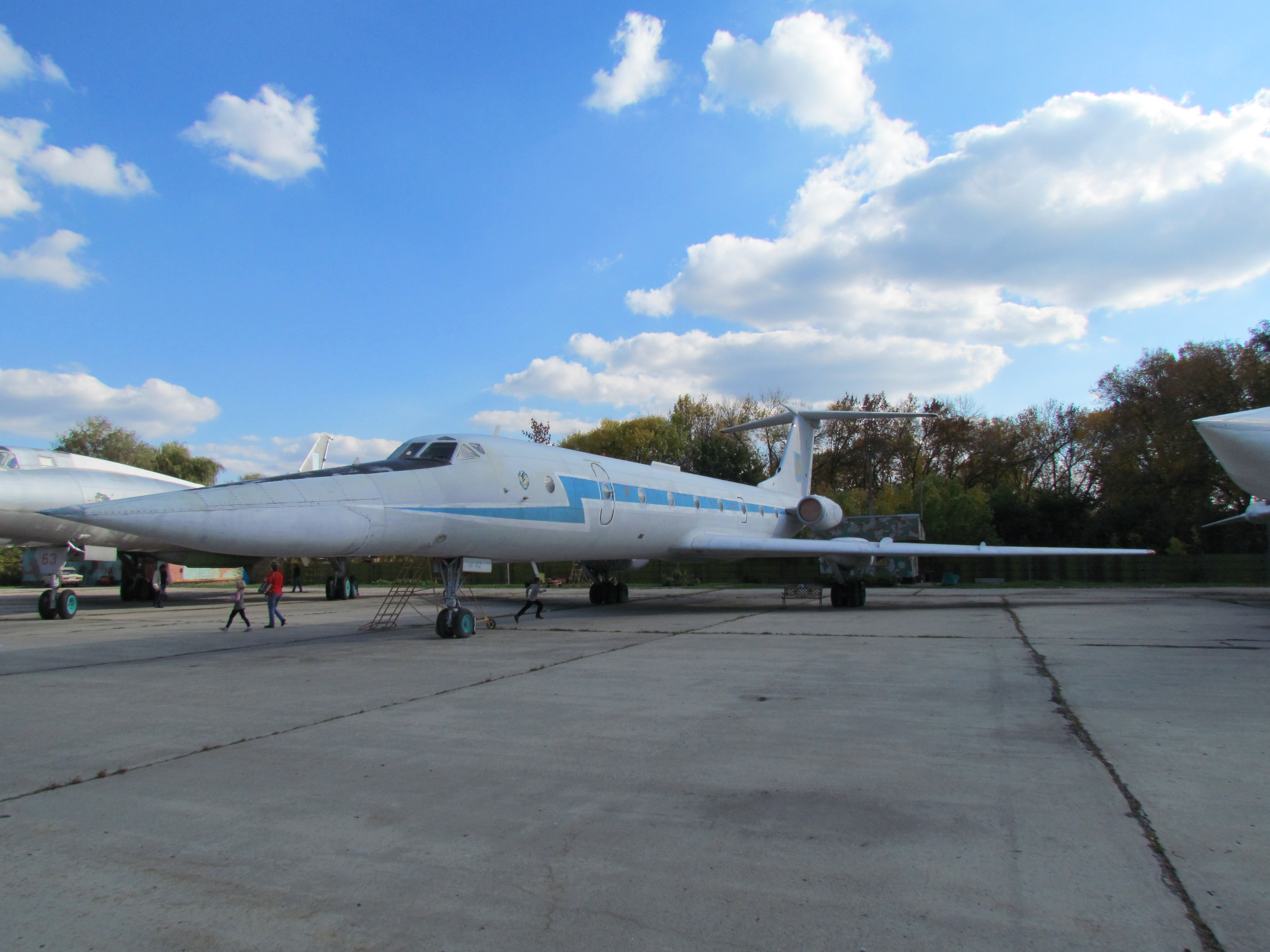
Tu-134UBL

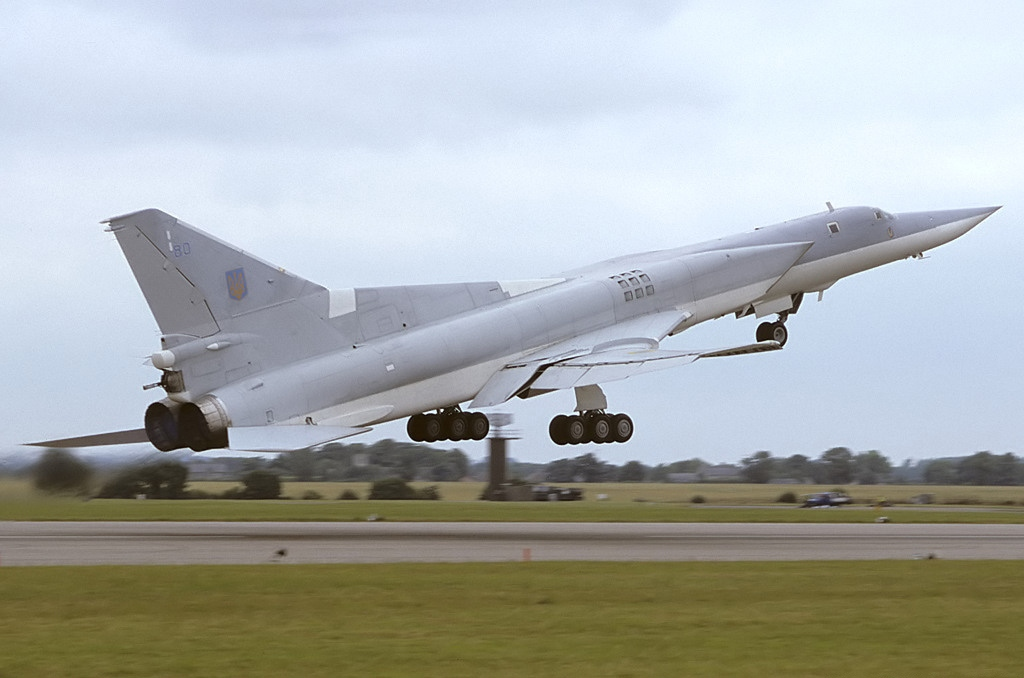
Tu-22М3 at RIAT 2000, England

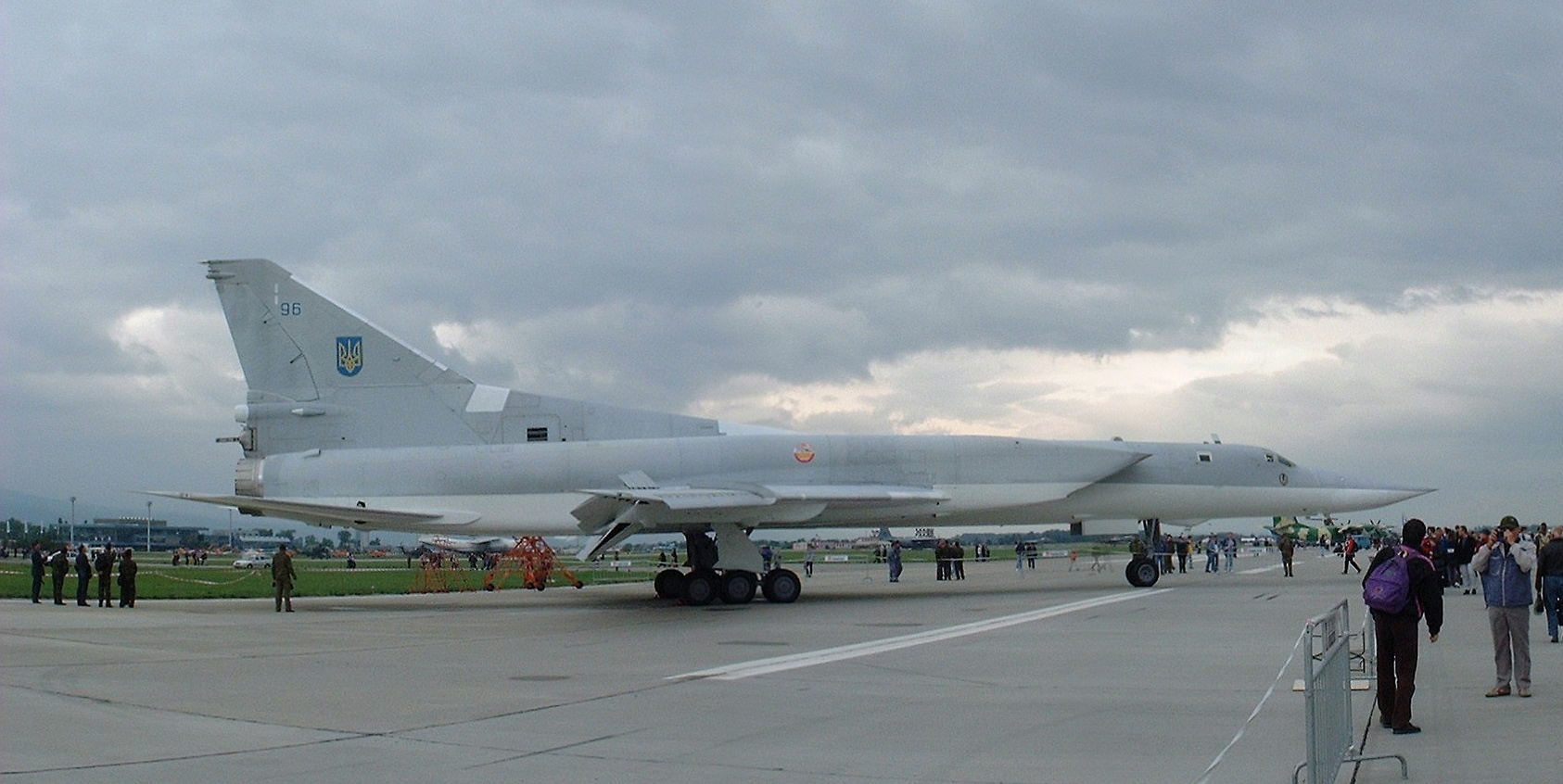
A Ukrainian Air Force Tu-22M3 at SIAD 2002 Air Show, Bratislava, Slovakia

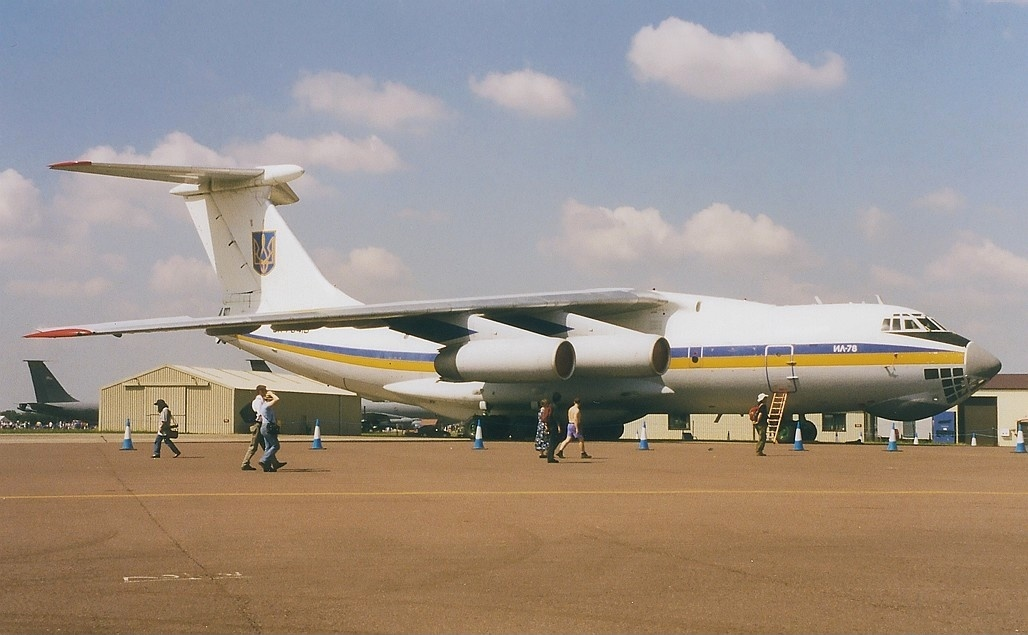
Il-78 at RIAT 1997, Fairford, England

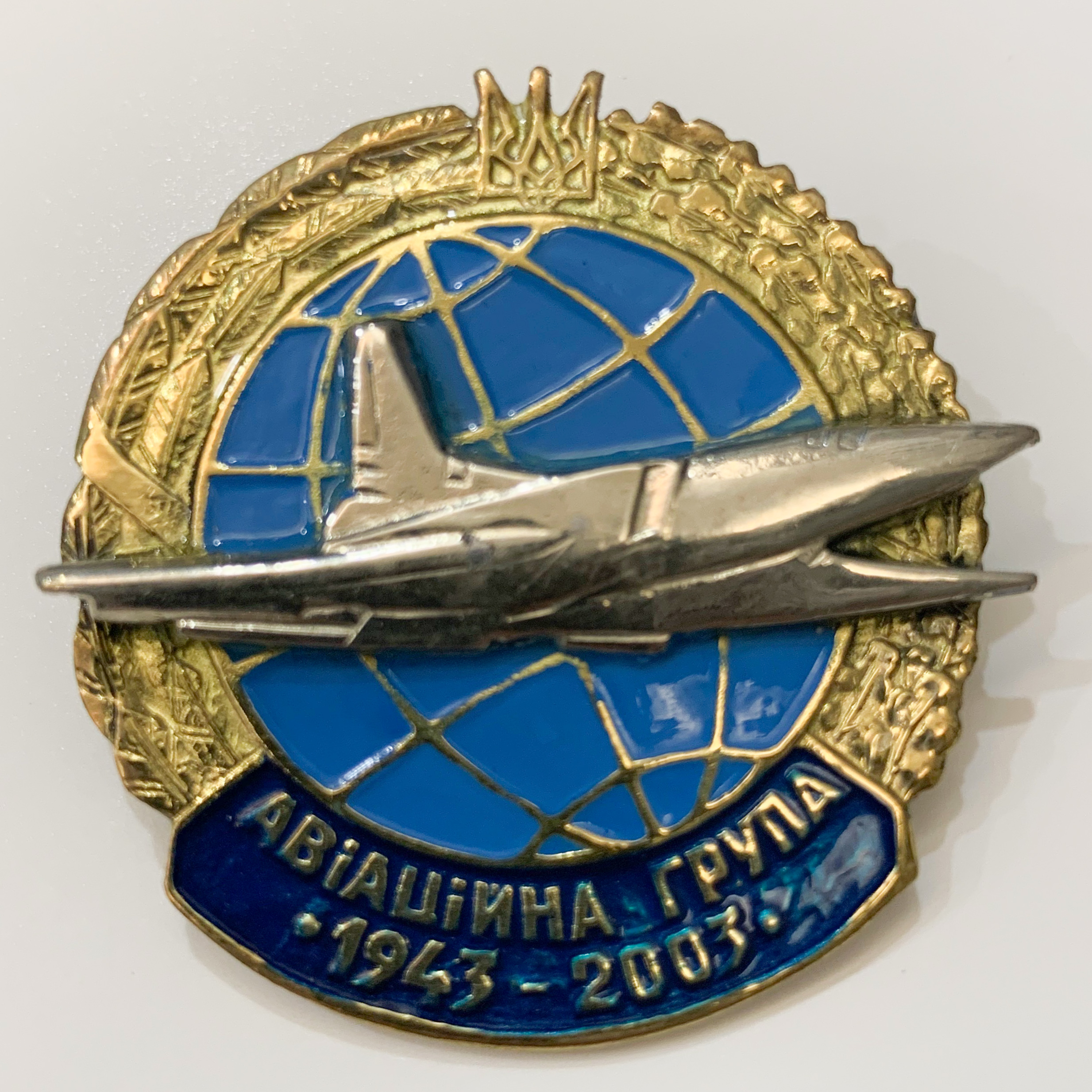
Medal Ukraine Aviation Group

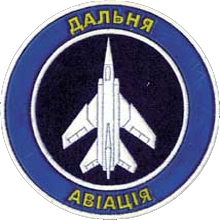
Ukrainian Air Force Long Range Aviation shoulder sleeve insignia

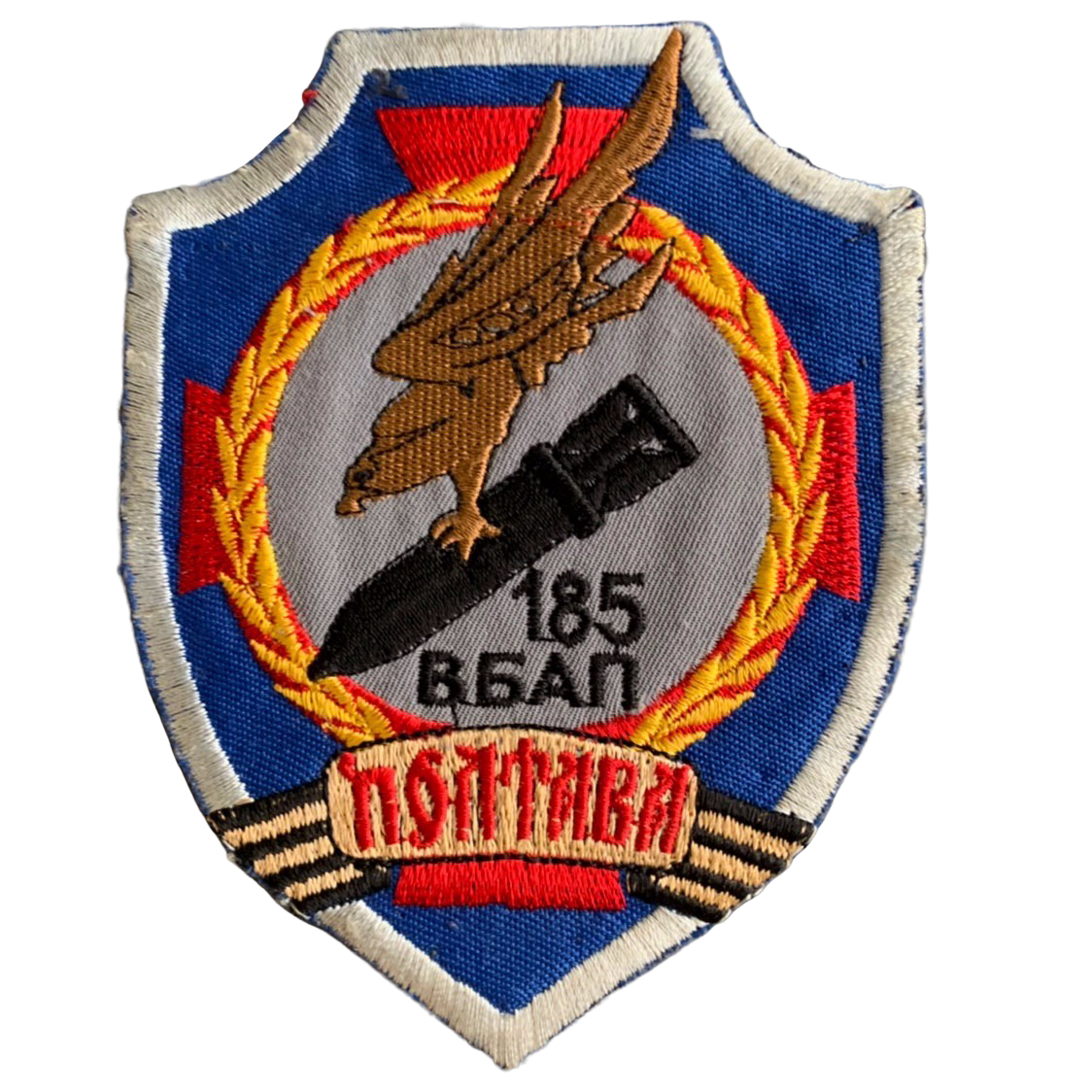
Chevron of the 185th GvTBAP

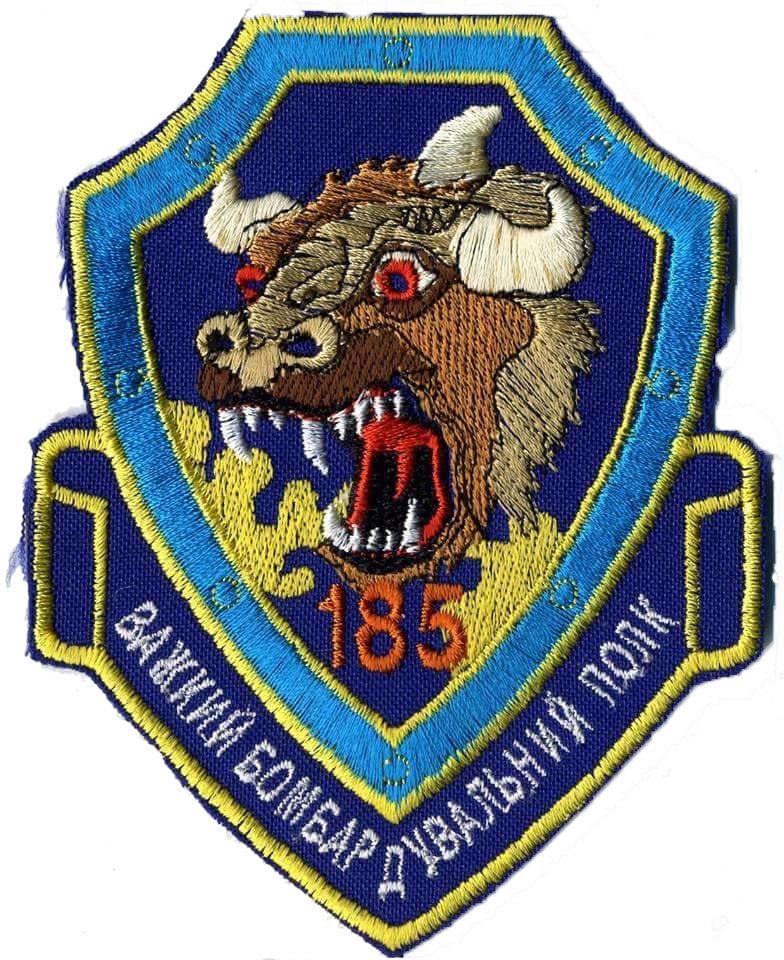
Chevron of the 185th GvTBAP, approved in 1998. Used during the airshows

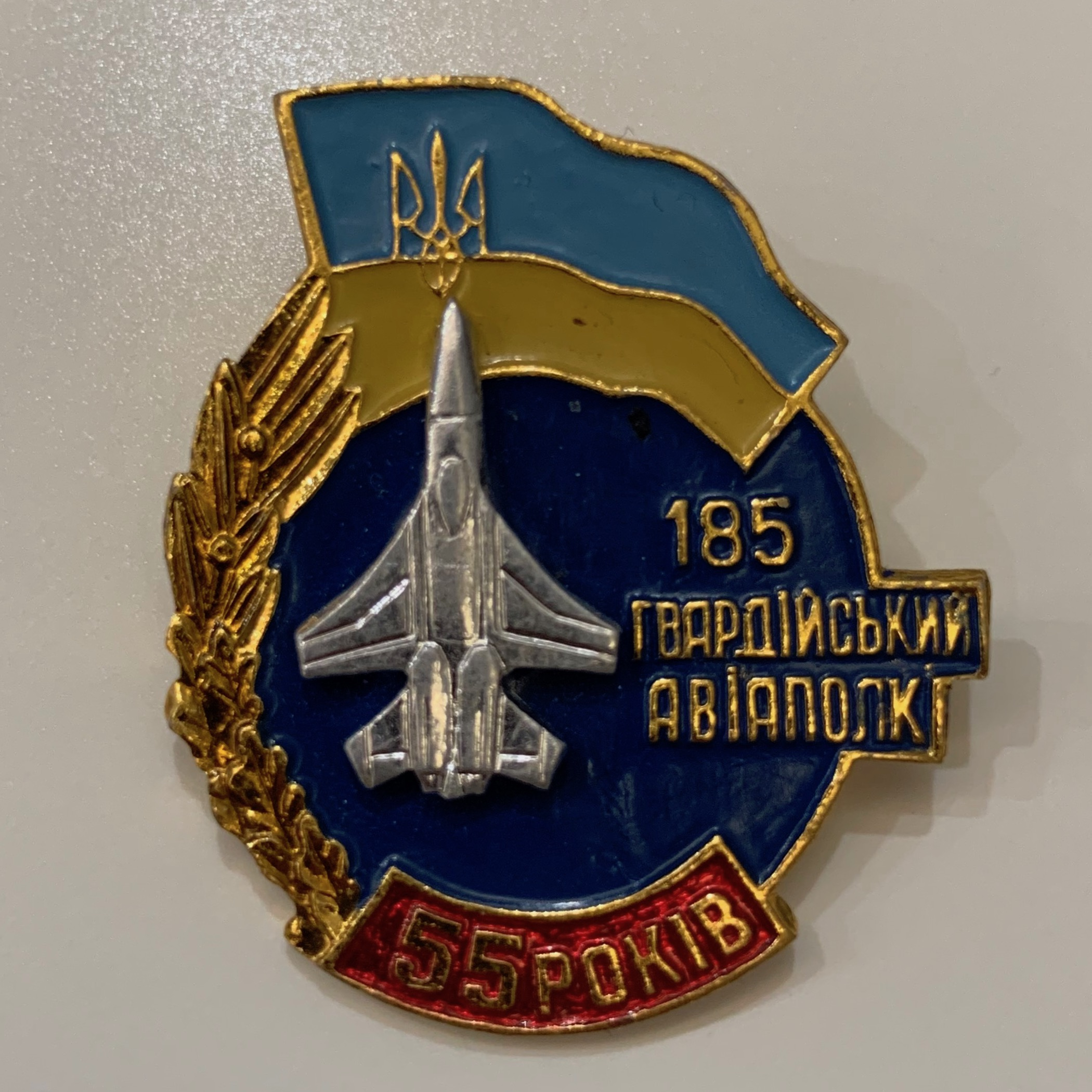
Medal 55 years of 185th GvTBAP

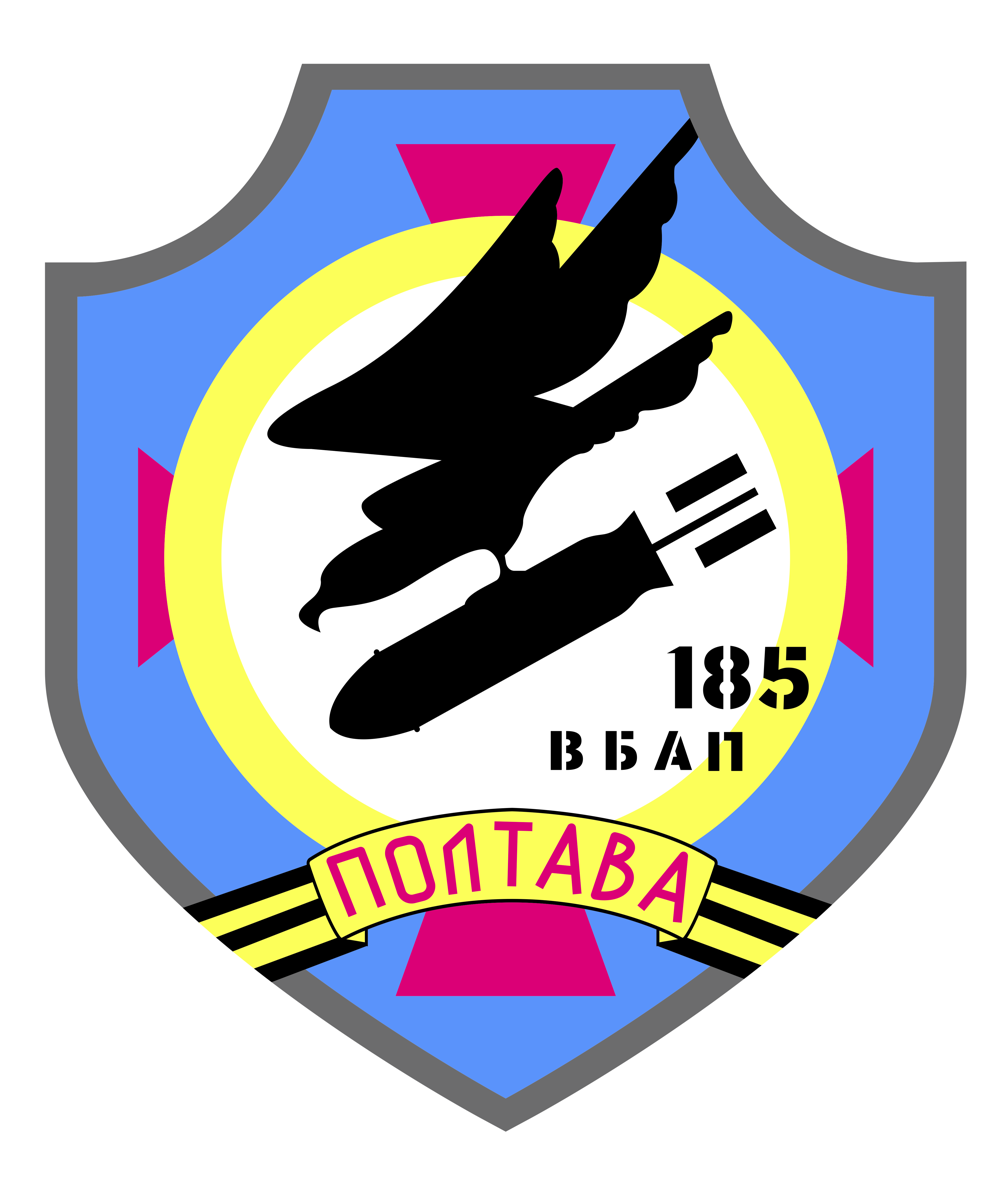
Emblem of the 185th GvTBAP.

== See also ==
- Poltava Museum of Long-Range and Strategic Aviation
- Russian Long Range Aviation – Russian counterpart
