= Uzyn (air base) =

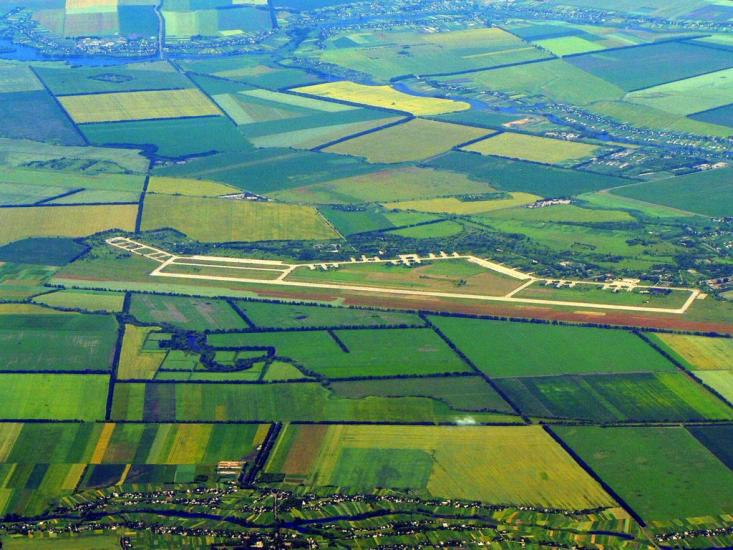
- IATA: none; ICAO: UKKH

Summary
- Airport type: Military
- Operator: Soviet Air Force
- Location: Uzyn, Kyiv Oblast, Ukraine
- Elevation AMSL: 502 ft / 178 m
- Coordinates: 49°47′25″N 30°26′27″E

Map
- Location in Kyiv Oblast Uzyn (Ukraine) Uzyn (Europe)

Runways
Direction	Length		Surface
Direction	ft	m	Surface
02/20	11,483	3,500	Concrete (80 m or 262 ft wide)

Uzyn (Chepelevka) is an inactive military airfield of the USSR and Ukrainian Long Range Aviation located on the south-eastern outskirts of Uzyn, Bila Tserkva Raion, Kyiv Oblast. It is one of the largest airfields in the territory of the former Soviet Union and Ukraine.

== Aerodrome data ==
- Name - Uzin (Chepelevka)
- Call sign - "Stolyarny" (start)
- Runway 02/20 3500 x 80
- Magnetic course: 016/196
- True course: 023/203
- CTA - N49.79032 ° E030.44085 °
- Excess of 178 m (21 hPa)
- Coating - hard (concrete)
- Lighting: none
- Regulations work - abandoned.

== History ==
A field airfield on the outskirts of Uzyn, Ukraine, the airbase was built before World War II.

The general in charge of the airfield wrote:

By the summer I returned to my regiment (after the courses of the academy). He stood 70 kilometers from Kiev, in Uzin. Ground airfield. Three hangars. The barracks. A small officer town with half a dozen surviving (after the war) two-story houses. Big village. Terrible off-road. No light, no sewage. Native penates ... My regiment was strong, flew confidently, well bombed and aptly hit air targets ... But God, how poor and hard we lived! In periods of mudslides, of which there was enough beyond measure, the airfield froze. Our chernozem limp, the roads crawled, the town tightly isolated from the outside world. Alive was only eight kilometers, for the needs of the sugar factory, a railway line, through which, if you walk on the tracks, you can get to the nearest railway station. In bad weather ... I repeatedly counted those sleepers back and forth, then hurrying to the division headquarters for the next meeting ... then returning to the regiment. Our houses and barracks were lit with candles and kerosene lamps. Unhappy dizelek only occasionally in the evenings gave light to the office space. I still couldn’t find a decent generator, get plenty of fuel, nor get building materials to somehow improve the life of the garrison ... Ordinary appendix inflammation was enough to give God the soul ... All kinds of my requests and reports are unknown drowned in senior headquarters. (Colonel General Aviation Reshetnikov Vasily Vasilyevich, at that time (1946) the commander of the aviation regiment).

In March 1955, the management of the 106th Heavy Bomber Aviation Division of the 43rd Air Army DA was formed at the Uzin airfield, and by the end of 1955 the first regiment of the division was formed - the 409th Heavy Bomber Aviation Regiment on Tu-95 aircraft. The first commander of the division was the twice Hero of the Soviet Union, Colonel Molodchy Alexander Ignatievich, the commander of the regiment was appointed Hero of the Soviet Union, Colonel Kharitonov N. N. A year later the second regiment of the division was formed - the 1006th heavy bomber aviation regiment, under the command of Yu. P. Pavlov.

By this time, the airfield and airfield infrastructure was built, and at the end of May 1956, the first Tu-95 aircraft landed at the airfield.

The development of the aircraft went at an accelerated pace, and in August 1956, the crews of the 1006th air regiment participated in the traditional air festival in Tushino. At the end of this year, a group of ten Tu-95s, under the command of the division commander, Major-General Molodchiy, made a flight along the route Engels - North Pole - Uzin.

In 1956, the 1023rd TBAP and the newly formed 79th TBAP were formed at the Uzin airfield. Airplanes from the 1006th regiment were transferred to this regiment. In 1957, the new regiment, together with the management of AD, departed to Semipalatinsk, and the 1006th TBAD remained "horseless" until 1959, then Tu-95K missile carriers began to enter it.

In the spring of 1959, the division commander, Hero of the Soviet Union, Lieutenant-General Aviation Reshetnikov with Chief Navigator YA Taranov, and Commander of the 1006th TBAP Murnin with Senior Navigator-Inspector YES Hero of the Soviet Union Ageyev, a pair of Tu-95 aircraft surpassed the official flight range record, flying 17150 and 16950 km respectively.

In the period until the end of the 1950s, service and residential premises were put into operation in the garrison. Also, with the filing of the first secretary of the Kyiv regional party committee, Petr Yefimovich Shelest, to Uzin, an overhead transmission line from the trunk network was finally stretched. All transmission towers were installed by the garrison personnel.

The crews of the division in 1961-1962 took an active part in the testing of nuclear weapons. On October 30, 1961, the crew of Major A.E. Durnovtsev (navigator-major Tick I.N.) dropped the most powerful thermonuclear bomb at the Novaya Zemlya test site.

In 1962, the Guards Red Banner Sevastopol-Berlin 182nd Guards TBAP, with basing at the Mozdok airfield, joined the division.

All the regiments of the division mastered flights from unpaved, ice and tundra airfields, which were considered as distribution points and forward bases. In the future, all the regiments of the division were regularly deployed both at field airfields and at the bases of the Arctic Command of the USSR Air Force.

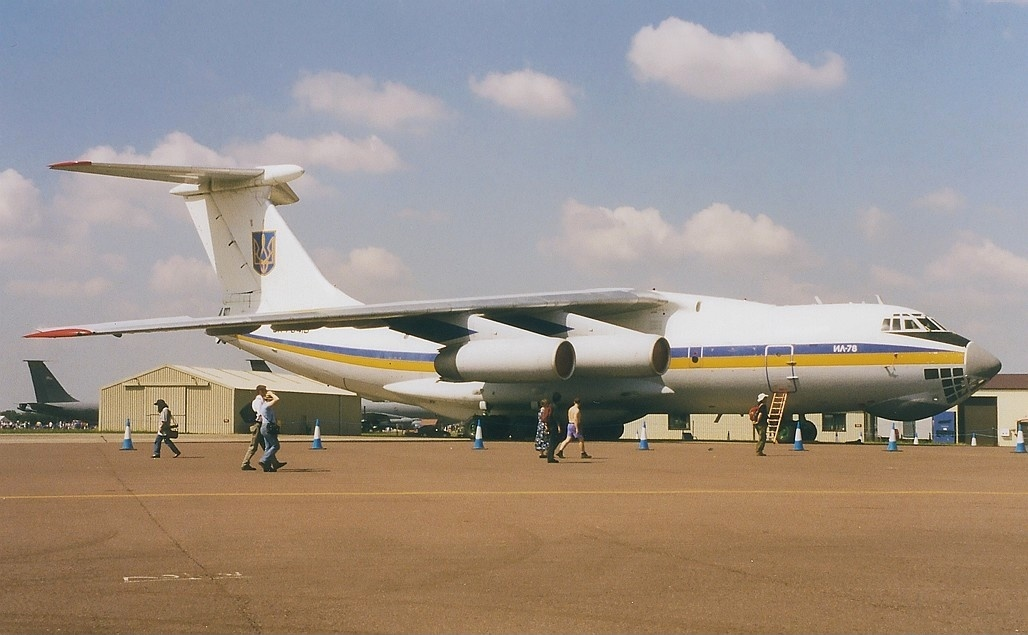
Ukraine Air Force Il-78 at Fairford, UK - England in 1997

1006th TBAP reequipped with Tu-95MS in 1985.

From 1991 to 1992 the Soviet Air Force was superseded in Ukraine by the Ukrainian Air Force, which eventually deployed the Tu-95MS with the 1006th TBAP and Il-78 with the 409th Aviation Regiment of tanker aircraft, before this unit was finally disbanded in 2001. Since 1993, some of the Il-78 were disposed of their refueling equipment and used as cargo aircraft, the other ones were sold to Algeria, India, Pakistan and China, where they are used for air refueling operations.

Uzin Air Base ceased to exist in 1998 after the US government arranged destruction of the Tu-95 aircraft through the Cooperative Threat Reduction Program.

By the end of 2001, 22 Ukrainian Tu-95MS were destroyed or transferred to Russia in exchange for debt for natural gas.

== Gallery ==
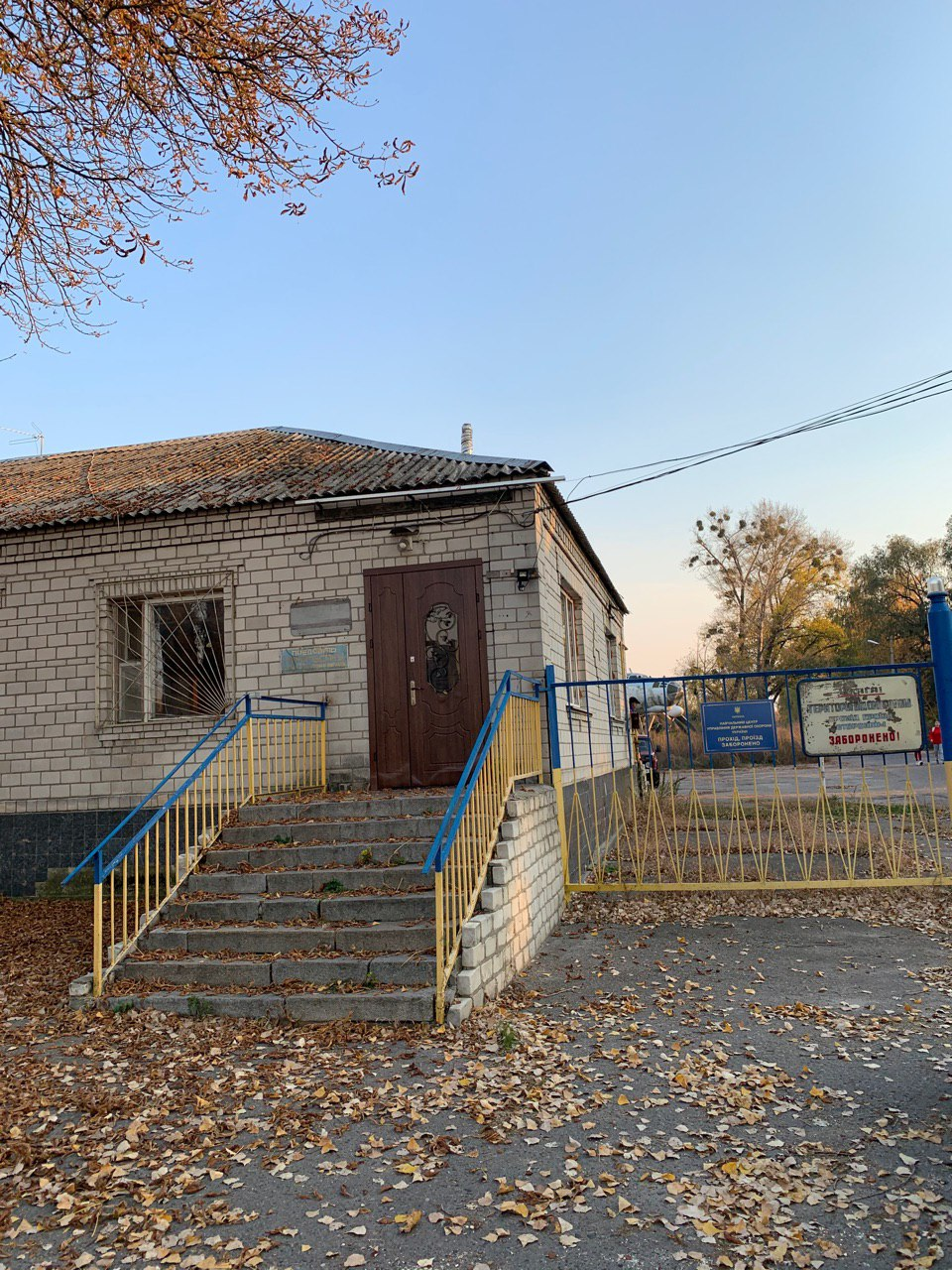
Uzyn Air Base checkpoint

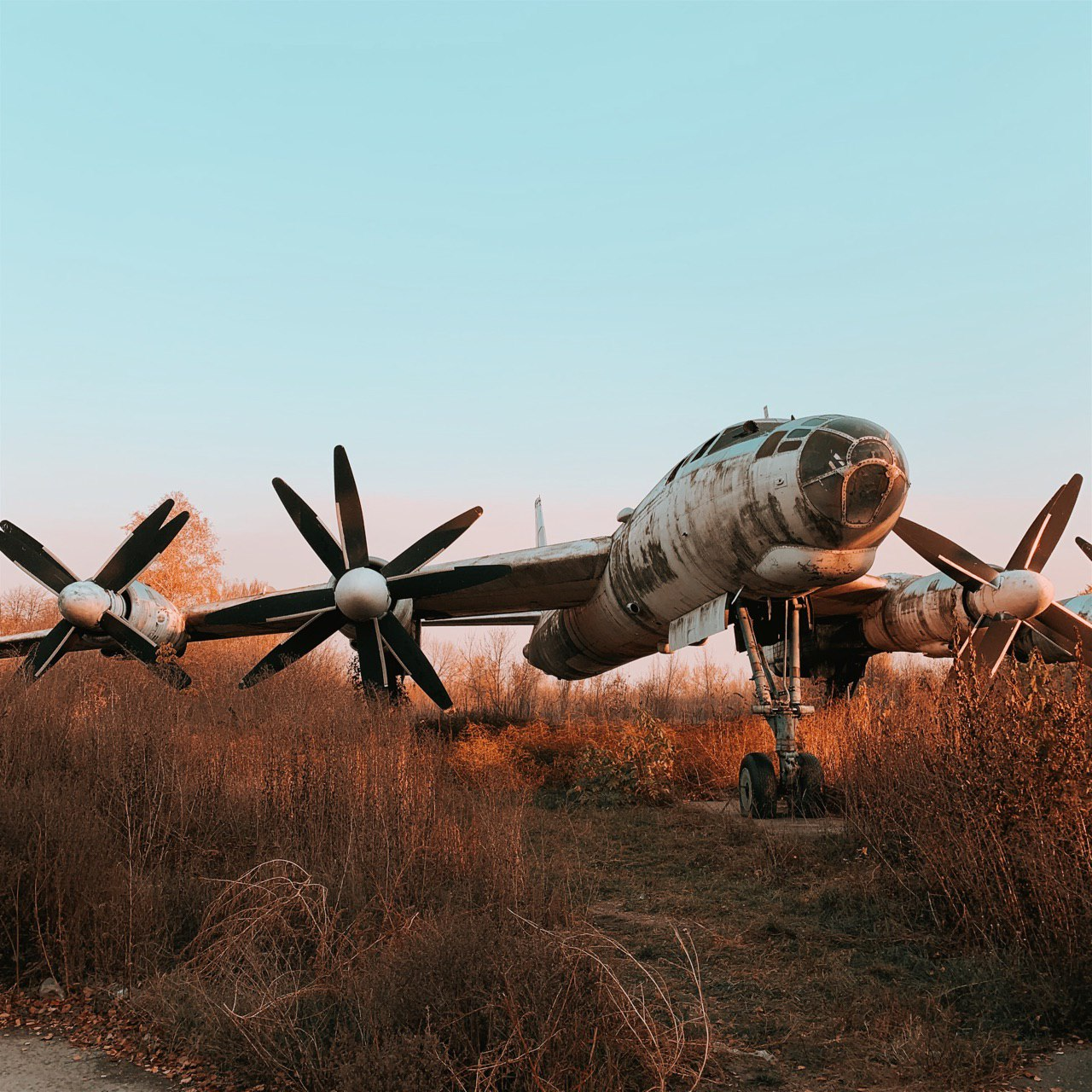
Tu-95U at Uzyn Air Base

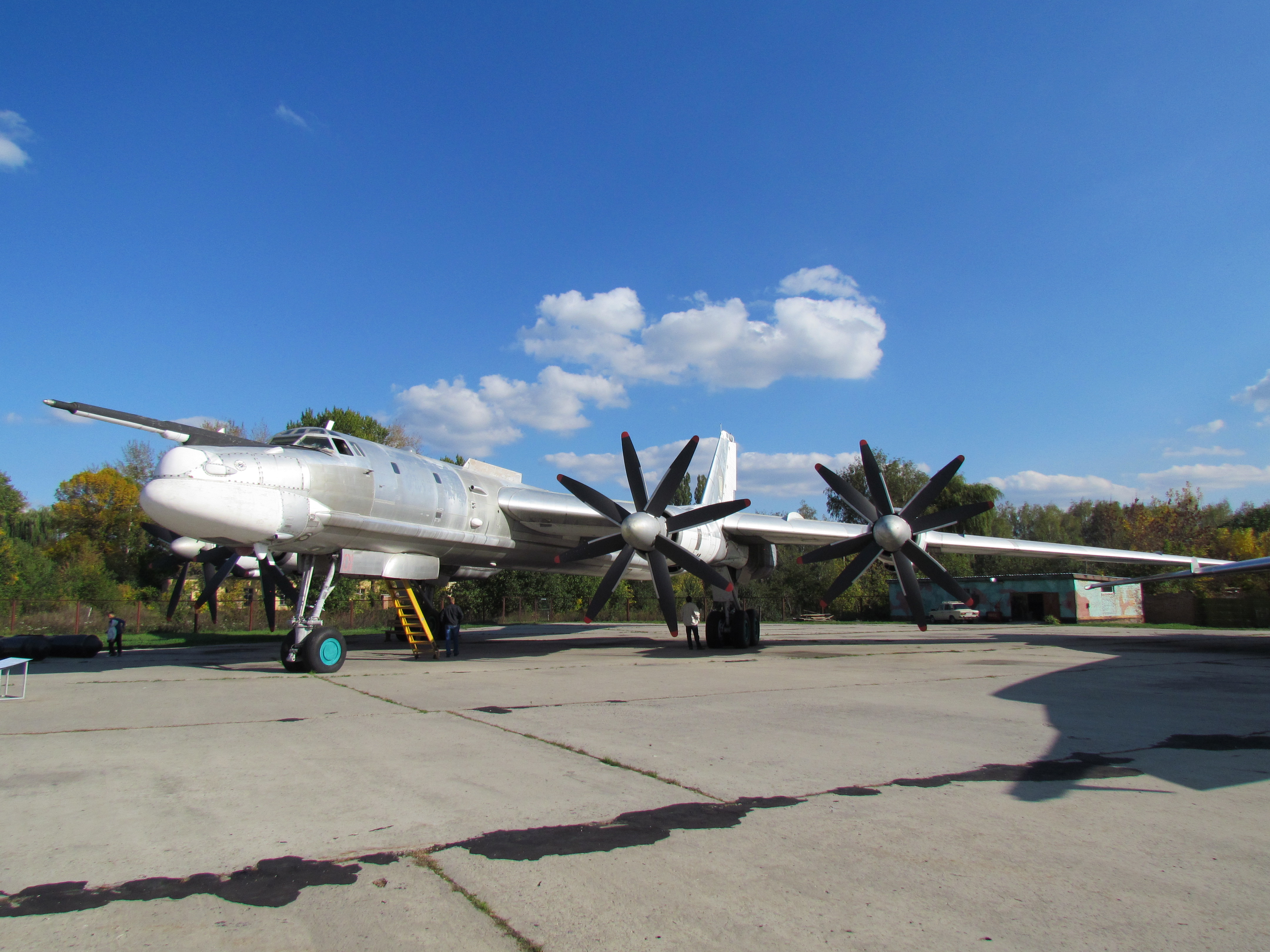
Tu-95МС from Uzyn Air Base at the Museum of Long Range Aviation in Poltava

== Aircraft operated ==
- Tu-95
- Il-78

== See also ==
- Ukrainian Long Range Aviation
- Pryluky Air Base
