= Nizhyn Air Base =

Military airport in Chernihiv Oblast, Ukraine

Nizhyn
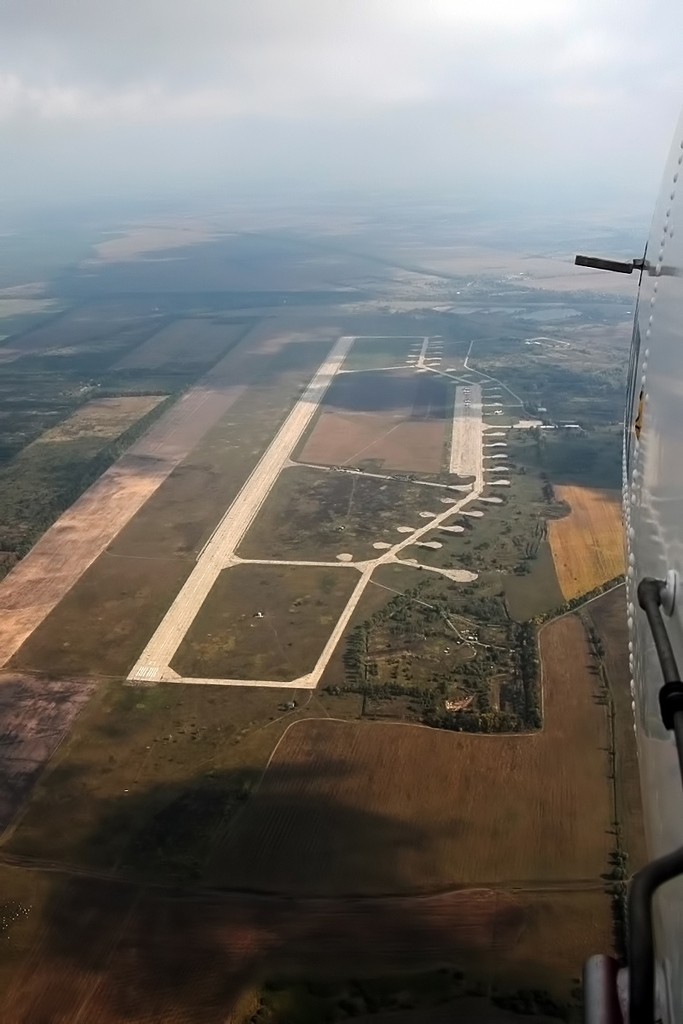
- Airport Overview
- IATA: none; ICAO: UKRN

Summary
- Airport type: Military
- Operator: State Emergency Service of Ukraine
- Location: Nizhyn, Chernihiv Oblast, Ukraine
- Elevation AMSL: 440 ft / 134 m
- Coordinates: 51°6′0″N 031°52′0″E

Maps
- Location of Nizhyn Air Base UKRN (Ukraine)
- Interactive map of Nizhyn

Runways
Direction	Length		Surface
Direction	ft	m	Surface
	9,842	3,000	Concrete

Nizhyn is an air base in Chernihiv Oblast, Ukraine 4 km (2.5 mi) north of Nizhyn. It was operated by the Soviet Long Range Aviation and Ukrainian Long Range Aviation. It is a medium-sized bomber base with a modern design and is being used to store some of Ukraine's older bombers. The airfield has 33 large revetments along a curved taxiway.

== History ==
During 1964-67 the base began converting to the Tupolev Tu-22R (Blinder) and by 1967 it had 24 Tu-22s based here. The reconnaissance variants were tasked with operations in Western Europe. In July 1969 two Tu-22 aircraft collided in mid-air; the crew ejected and the plane flew on unpiloted for 52 minutes, threatening the city of Nizhin before crashing 0.5 km from the city's railway station. In November 1988 three Tu-22R were deployed to Mozdok to fight in Afghanistan, but returned to base a week later without seeing any combat. Some Tu-22s were sent to Nizhyn for disposal, probably in the 1990s.

Units stationed at Nizhyn include:

- 199 ODRAP (199th Independent Long-Range Reconnaissance Aviation Regiment) flying Tu-22R from 1964 to the 1990s, and the Tu-22RDK, Tu-22K, and Tu-22UD as of 1991.

airforce.ru says that on December 30, 1996, the regiment was reorganized as the 18 separate Long Range Aviation Squadron. In the battle of the An-30B - 6 units., Tu-22P - 3 units., Tu-22U - 1 unit. Furthermore, on February 22, 1999, Decree #242 of the Verkhovna Rada 18 odrae transferred to the Ministry of Emergency Situations and renamed 300 Special Aviation Squadron MOE.
