= Poltava Museum of Long-Range and Strategic Aviation =

Aviation museum in Ukraine

- Музей важкої бомбардувальної авіації
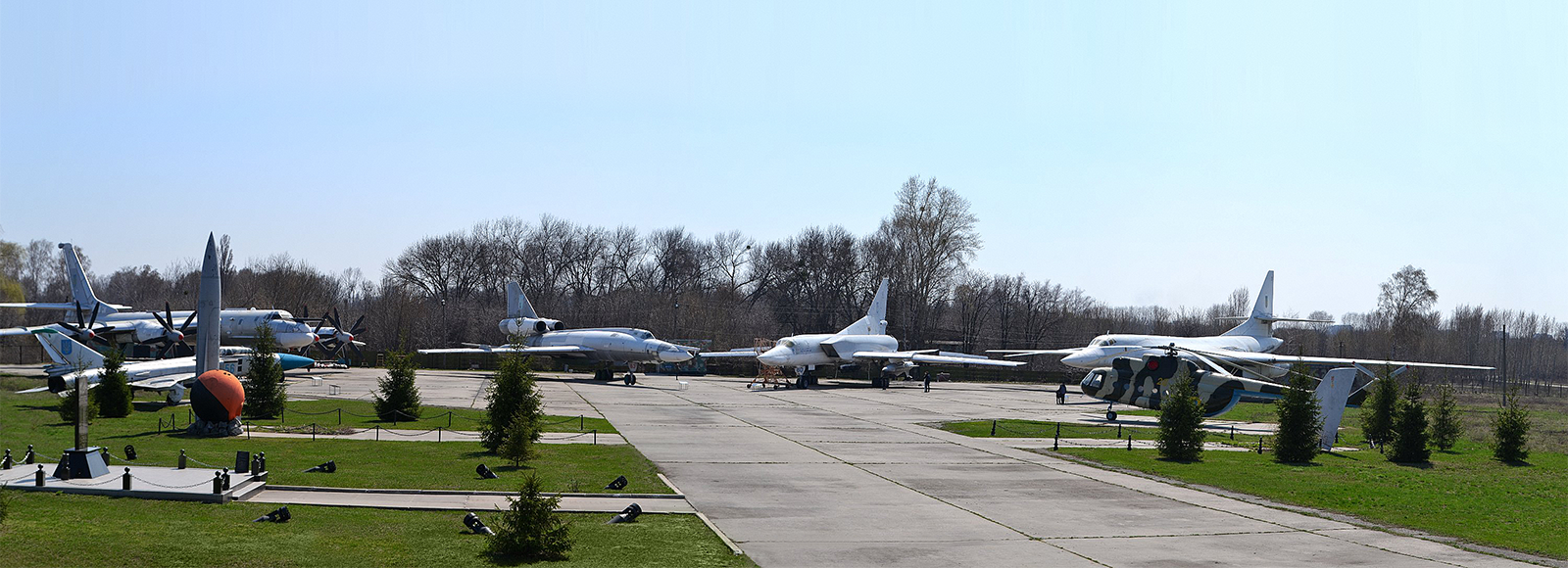
- Coordinates: 49.62°N 34.5°E
- Website: https://mvba.com.ua

The Poltava Museum of Long-Range and Strategic Aviation (Ukrainian: Музей важкої бомбардувальної авіації, romanized: Muzey vazhkoyi bombarduvalʹnoyi aviatsiyi, lit. 'Museum of Heavy Bomber Aviation') is a museum of long-range aviation equipment located in the Ukrainian city of Poltava, on the territory of the former air base "Poltava-4". Established on September 1, 2016 in accordance with the Order of the Minister of Defense of Ukraine No. 192 dated 11.04.2016 at the registered address: 1 Oleksandr Zasiadko Str., Poltava.

Until 2004, the 13th Guards Dnepropetrovsk-Budapest Order of Suvorov had a heavy bomber aviation division based at the air base. It consisted of 18 Tu-22M3 and 6 Tu-16.

According to the Ukrainian-American Agreement on the Elimination of Strategic Nuclear Weapons, in February 2006, at the Poltava military airfield, the last Tu-22M3 bomber Ukrainian Air Force was cut. For the museum exhibition two bombers were saved, and a few were brought from other locations.

In 2007, a museum was created on the territory of the former airbase thanks to the enthusiasm of former military pilots.

As of January 2014, and the exposition of the aviation museum includes nine aircraft, aircraft cruise missiles (KSR-2, KSR-5, Kh-22) and aerial bombs weighing from 100 to 9000 kg.

In 2025 it was reported that Ukraine’s intelligence service had attempted to train a targeting AI on some of the planes at the museum.

== Exhibits ==
Photo	Exhibit	Board number
	Antonov An-2 "Annie"	UR-54922 cn 1G187-15
	Aero L-29 Delfín	LA-0561 cn 194538
Photo	Aero L-39C Albatros	68 blue cn 232209
Photo	Mil Mi-2 Hoplite	81 cn 546131049
	Sukhoi Su-15UM Flagon-G ex-62 IAP at Belbek, Sevastopol	56 cn 0415319
	Тupolev Tu-16C-26 Badger-G ex-260 TBAP at Stryi	25 cn 8204014
	Tupolev Tu-22KD Blinder-B ex-341 TBAP at Ozerne	63 cn 46-01
	Tupolev Тu-22М3 Backfire-C "Alexander Molodchy" ex-260 TBAP at Stryi	80 blue cn 3686153
	Tupolev Тu-95МS Bear-H ex-1006 TBAP at Uzin	01 cn 32191
	Tupolev Tu-134UBL ex-185 TBAP at Poltava	42 cn 64300
	Tupolev Tu-160 Blackjack ex-185 TBAP at Poltava	26 cn 81804921
	KSR-2	
	KSR-5	
	Kh-22	
	FAB-9000 М-54	

== Gallery ==
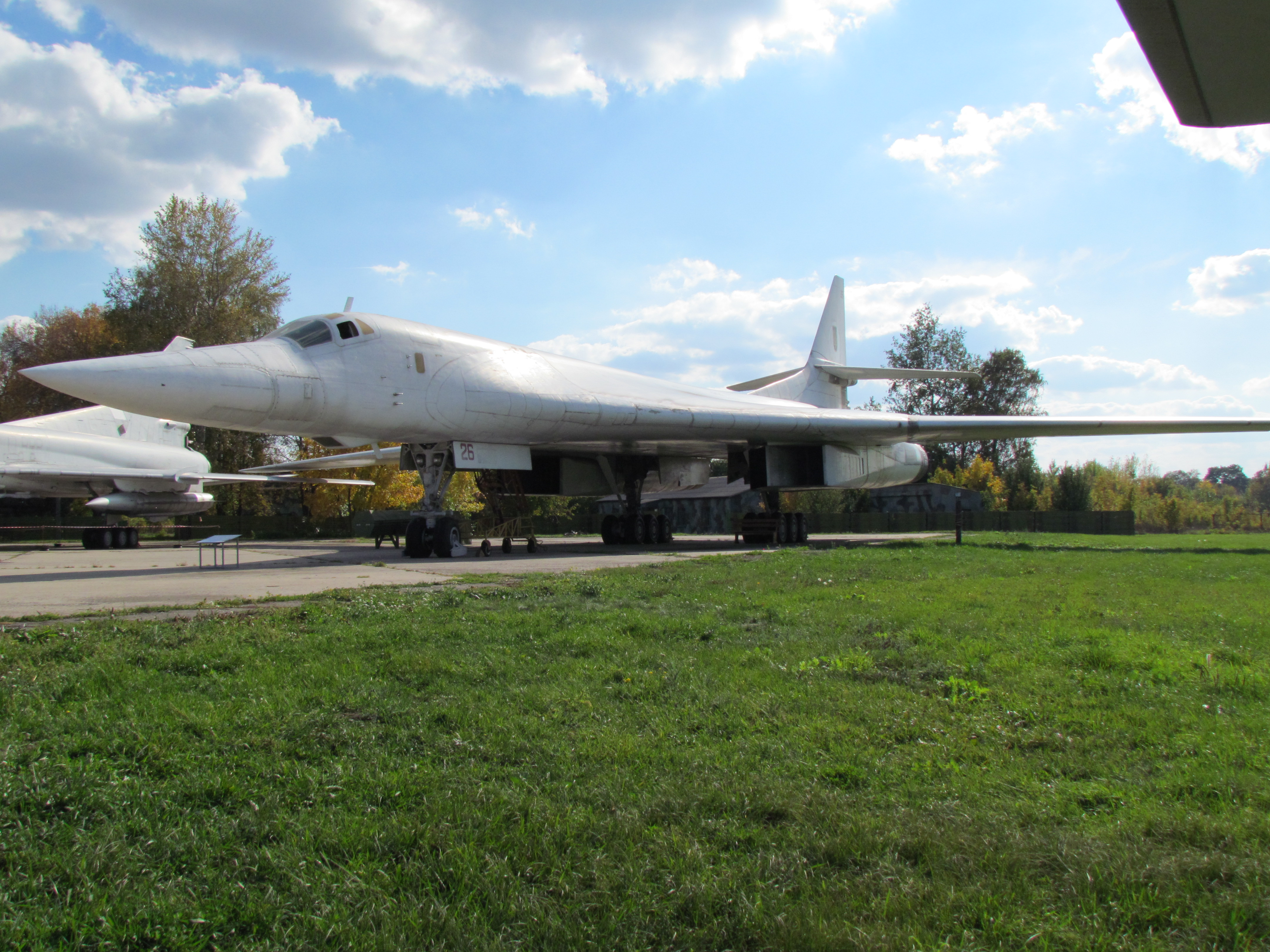
Tu-160

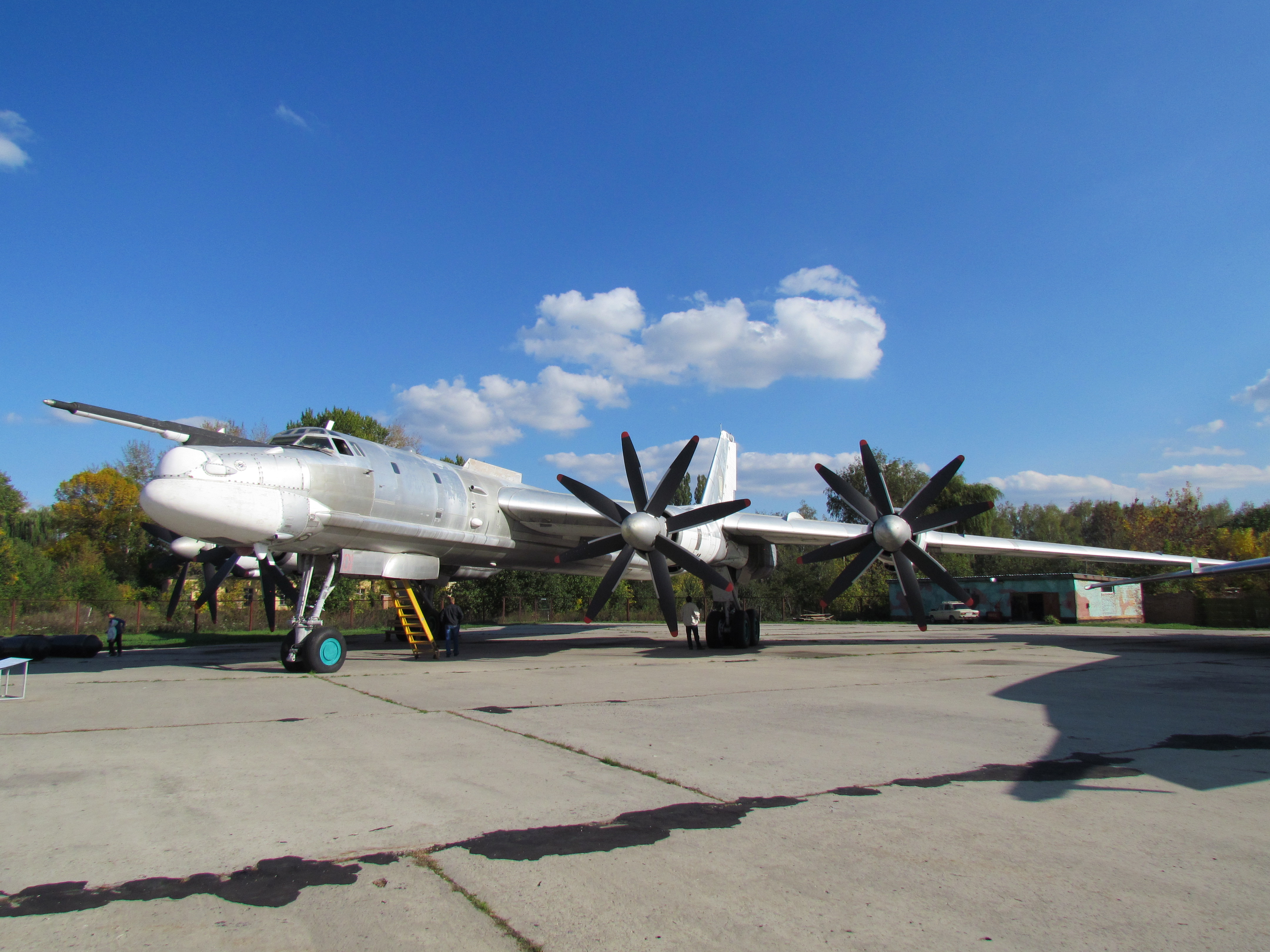
Tu-95МS

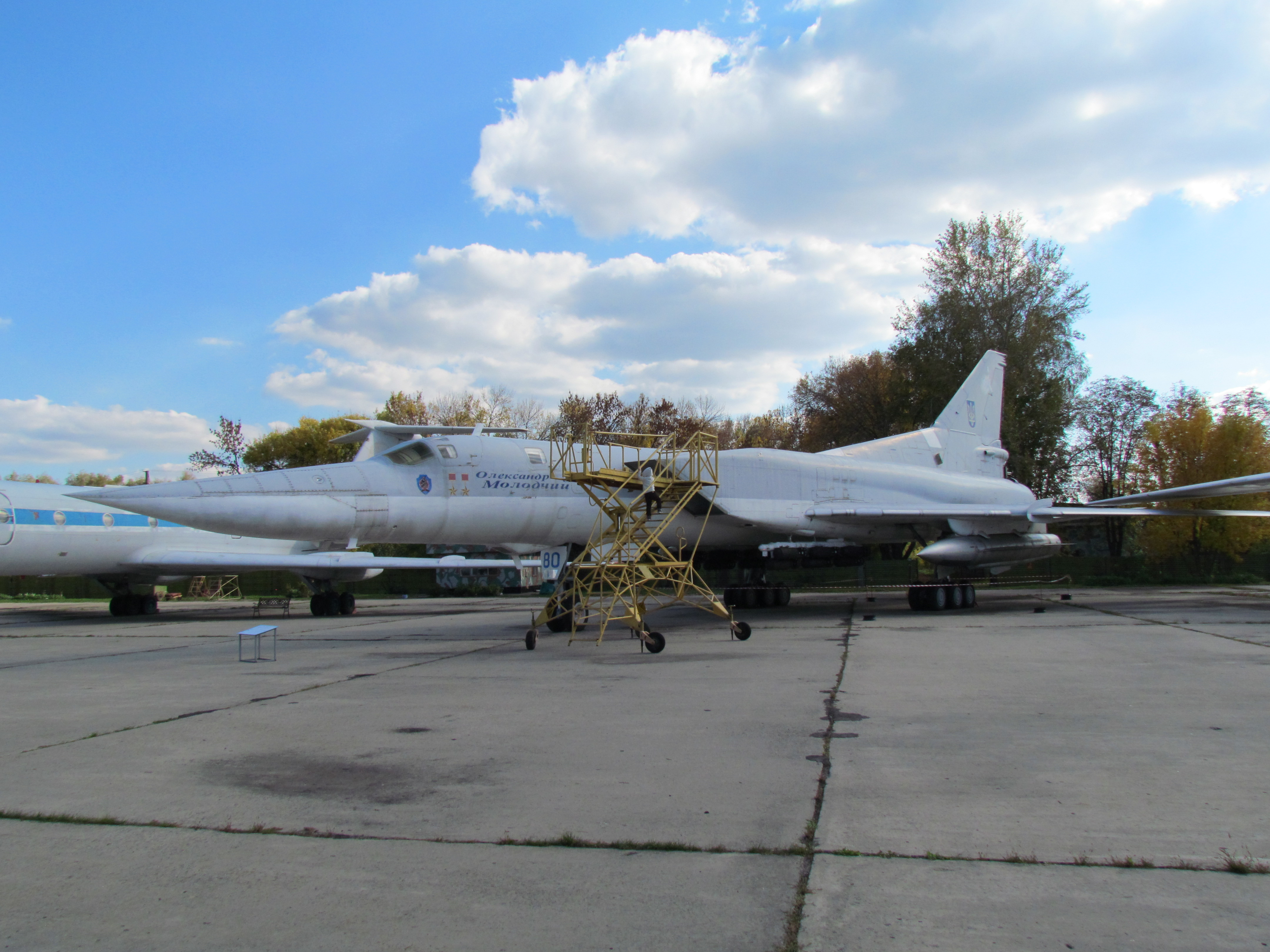
Tu-22М3

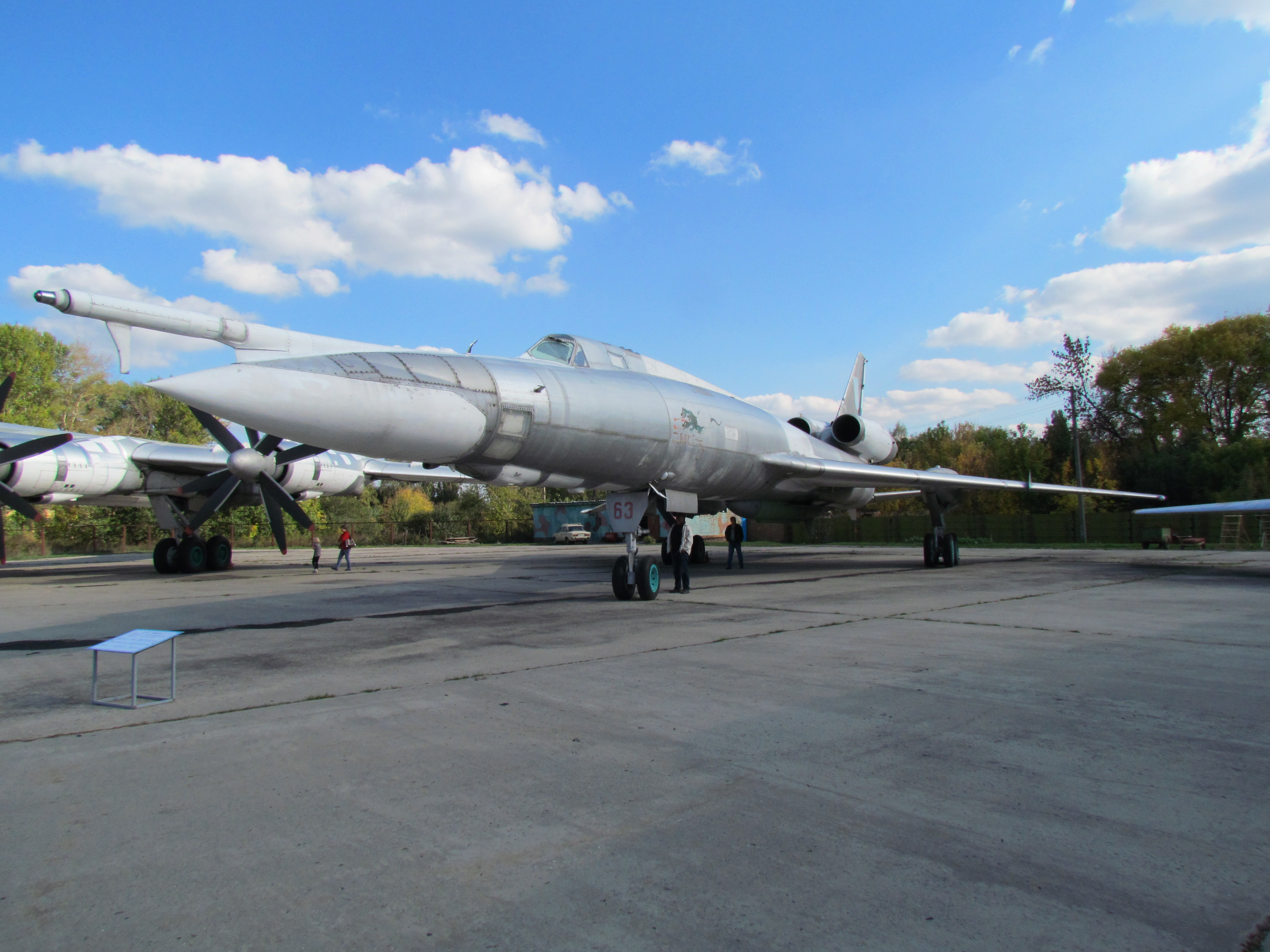
Tu-22KD

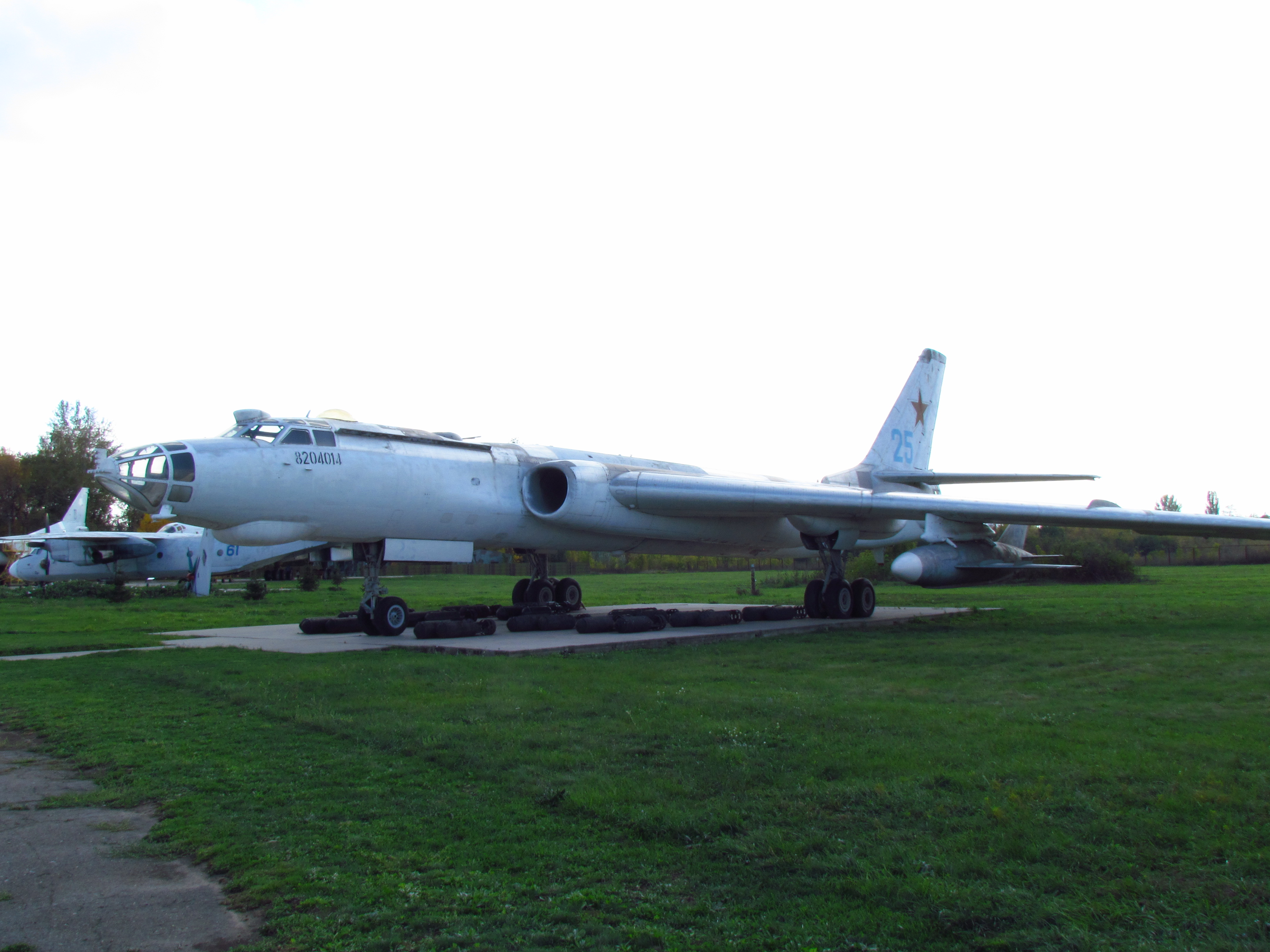
Tu-16C

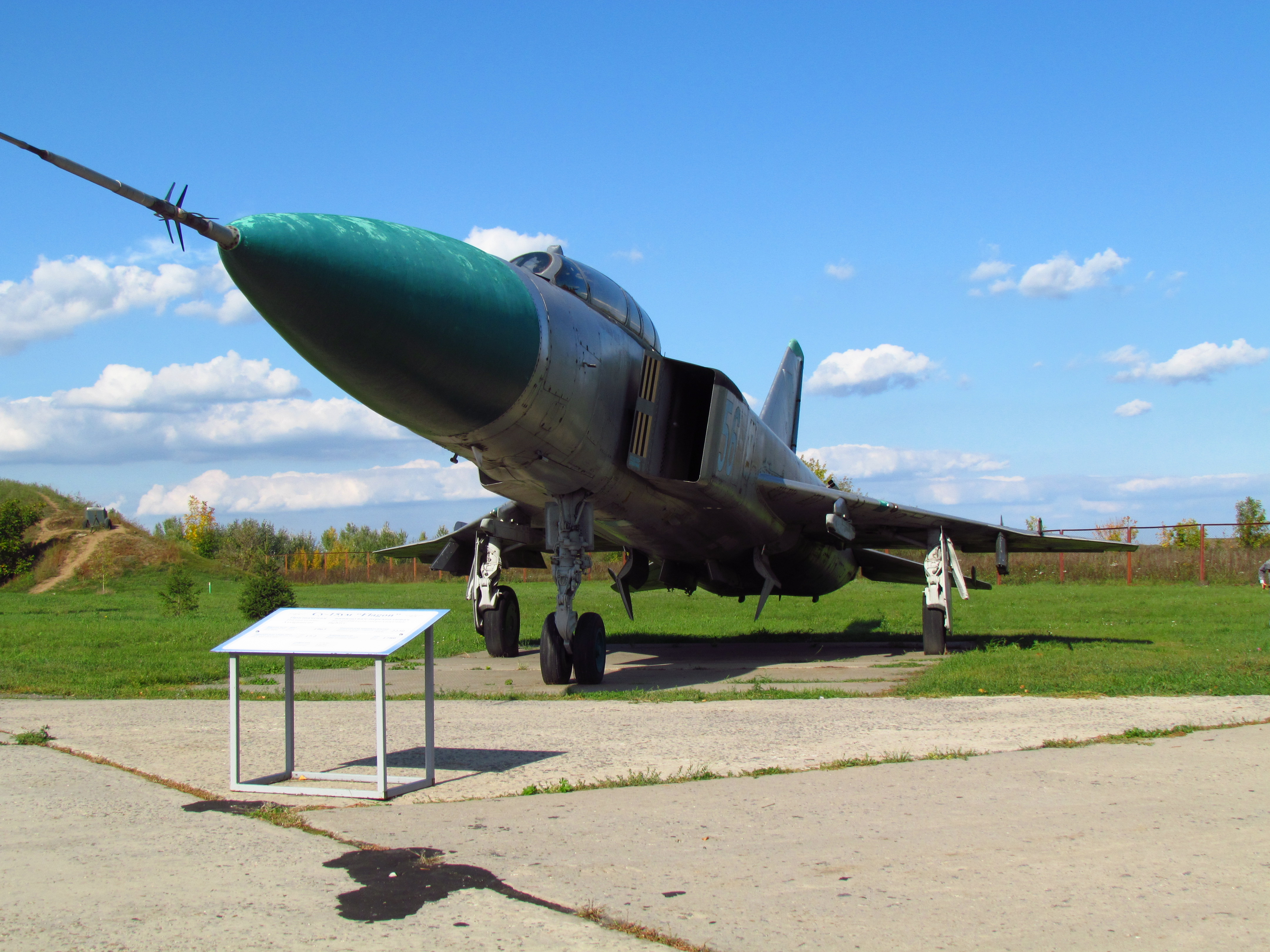
Su-15UM

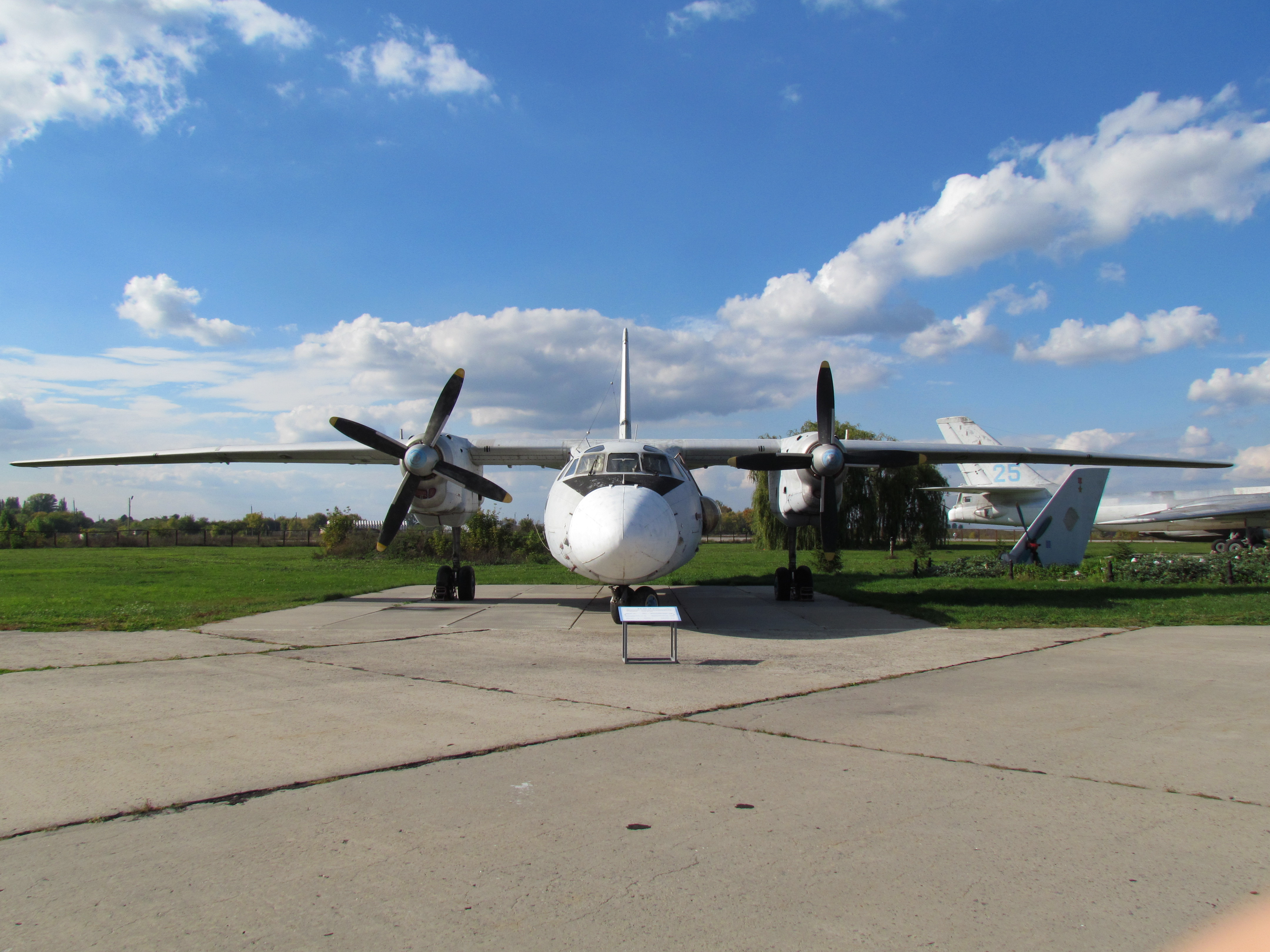
An-26

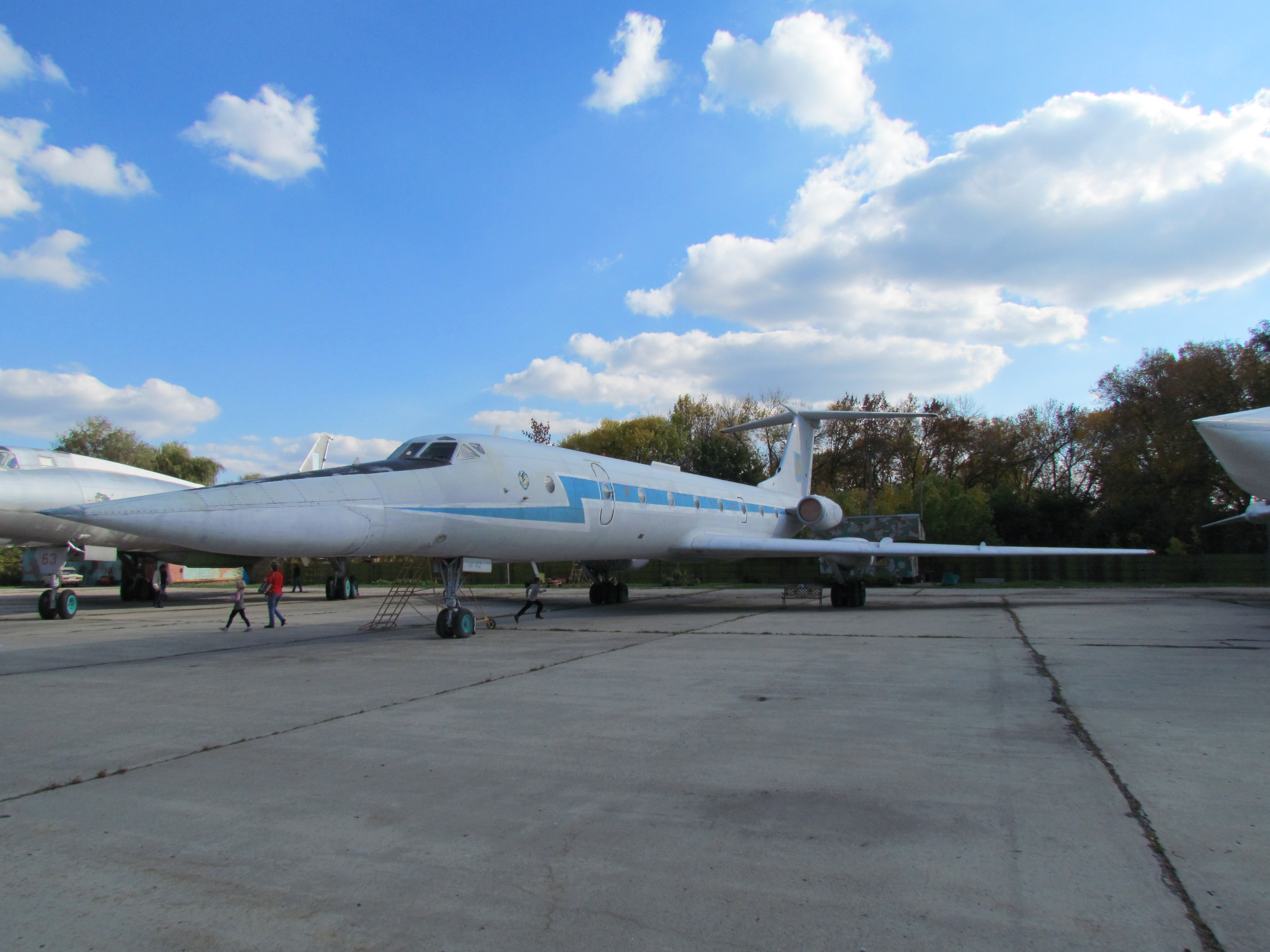
Tu-134UBL

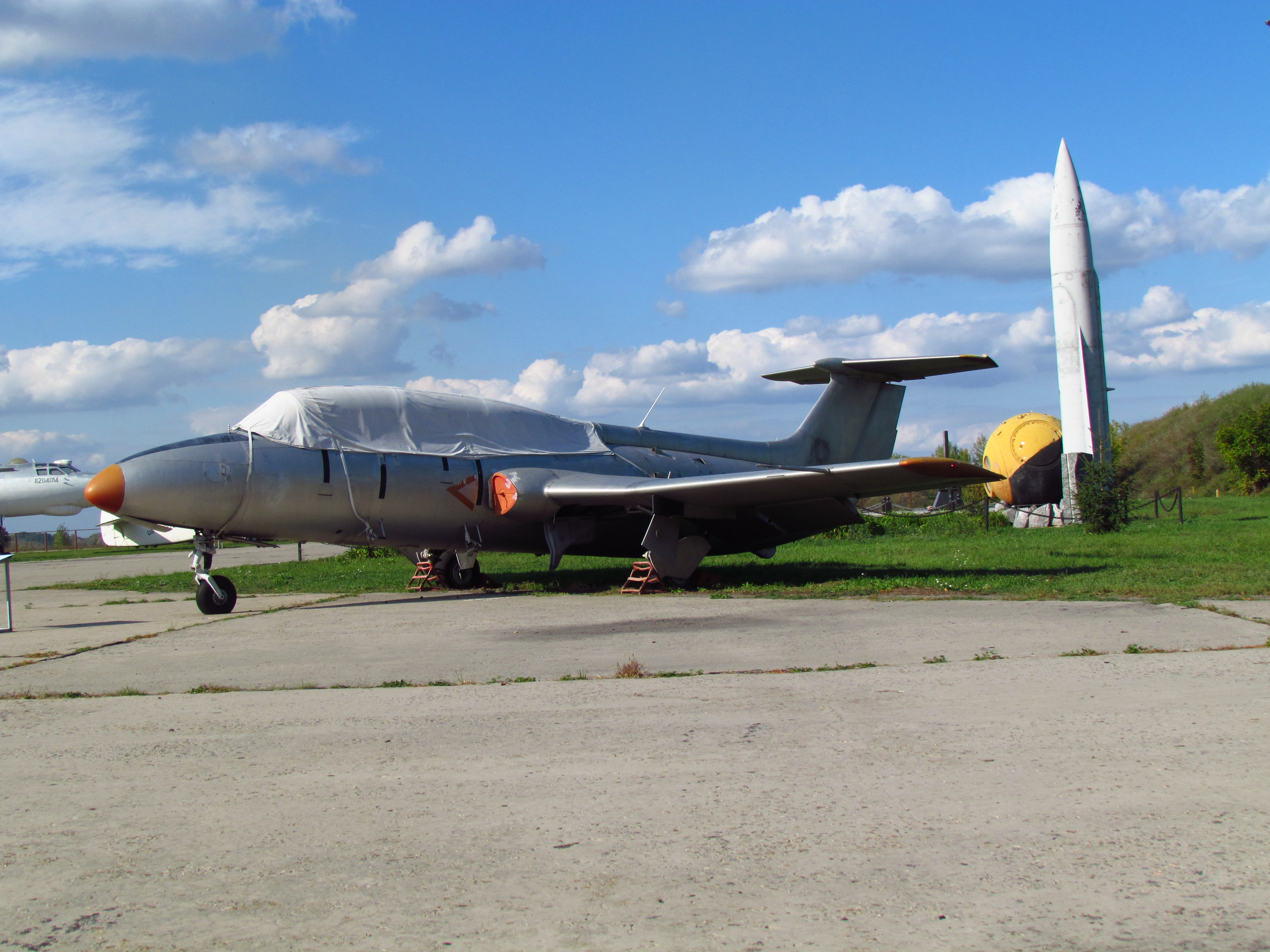
L-29 Delfin

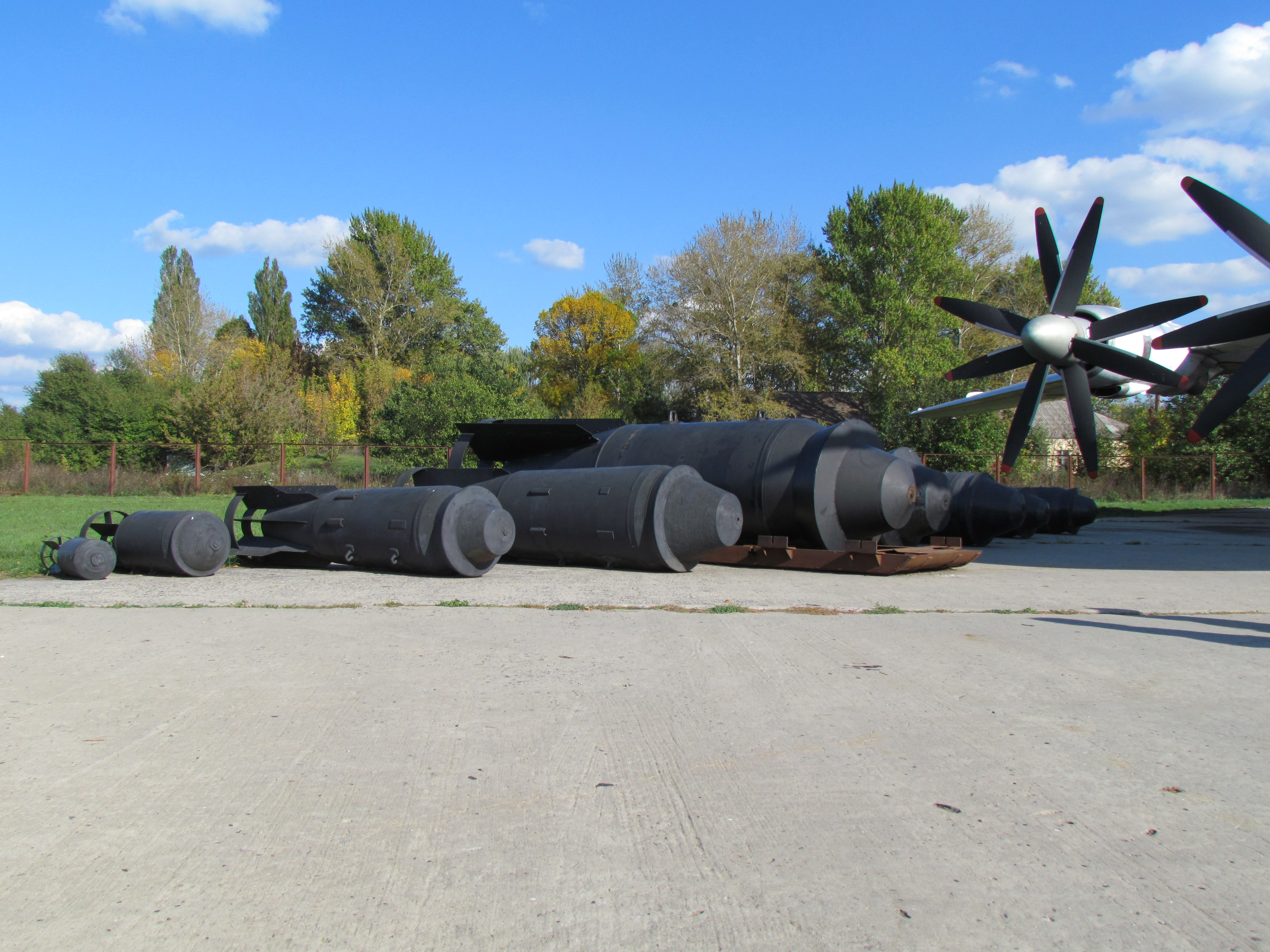
Bombs

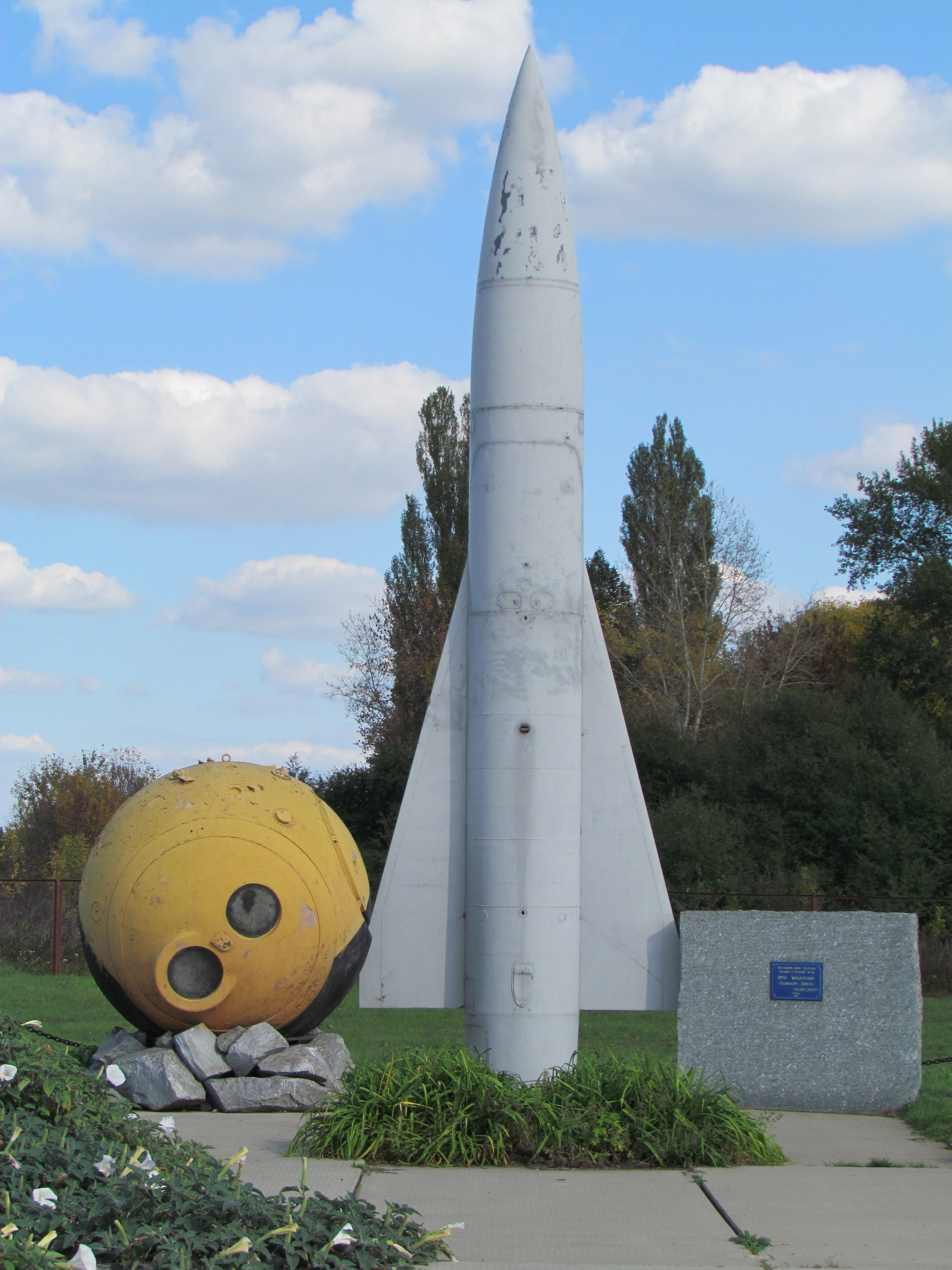
Memorial to YV Kondratyuk

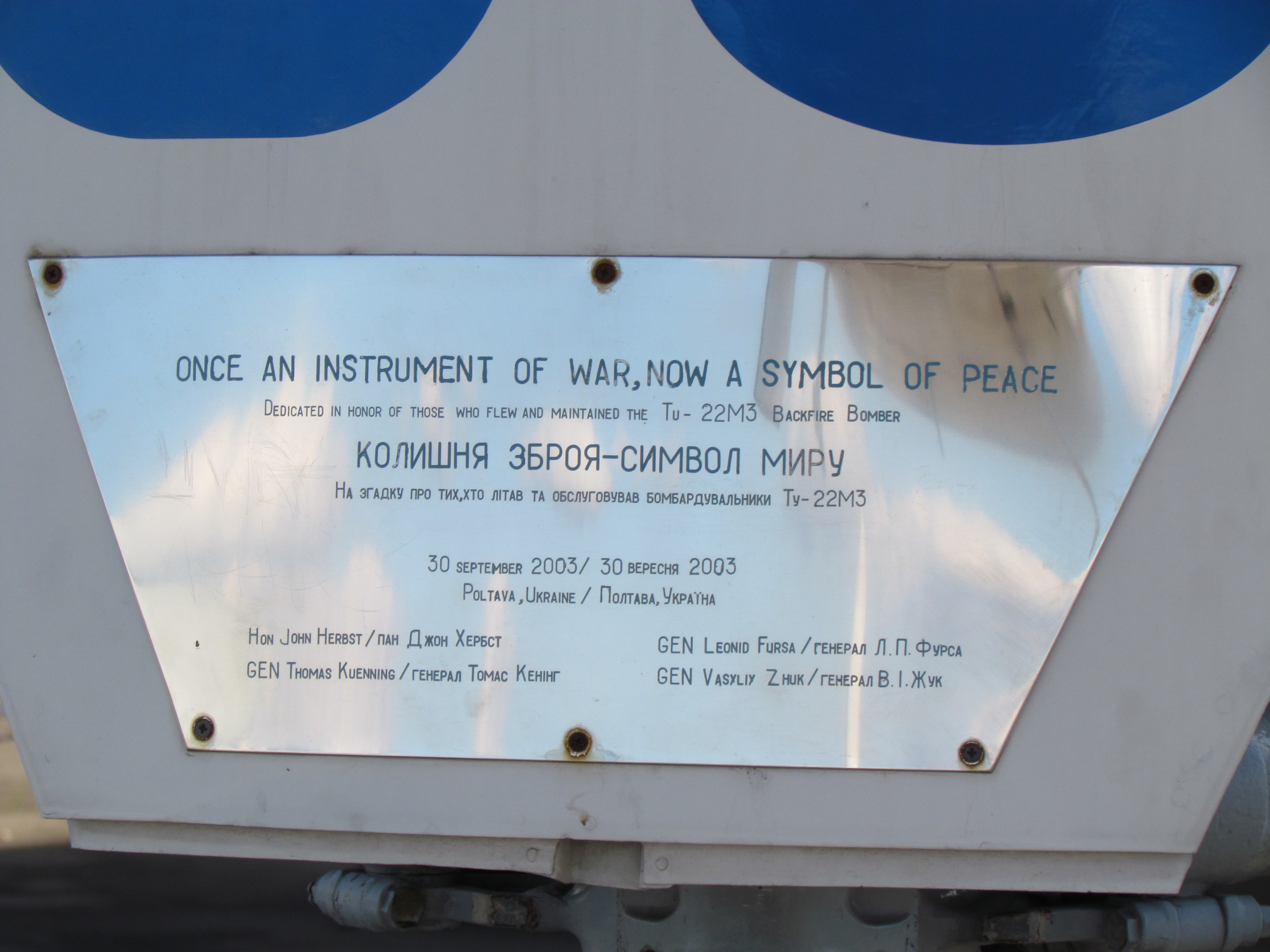
Symbol of peace

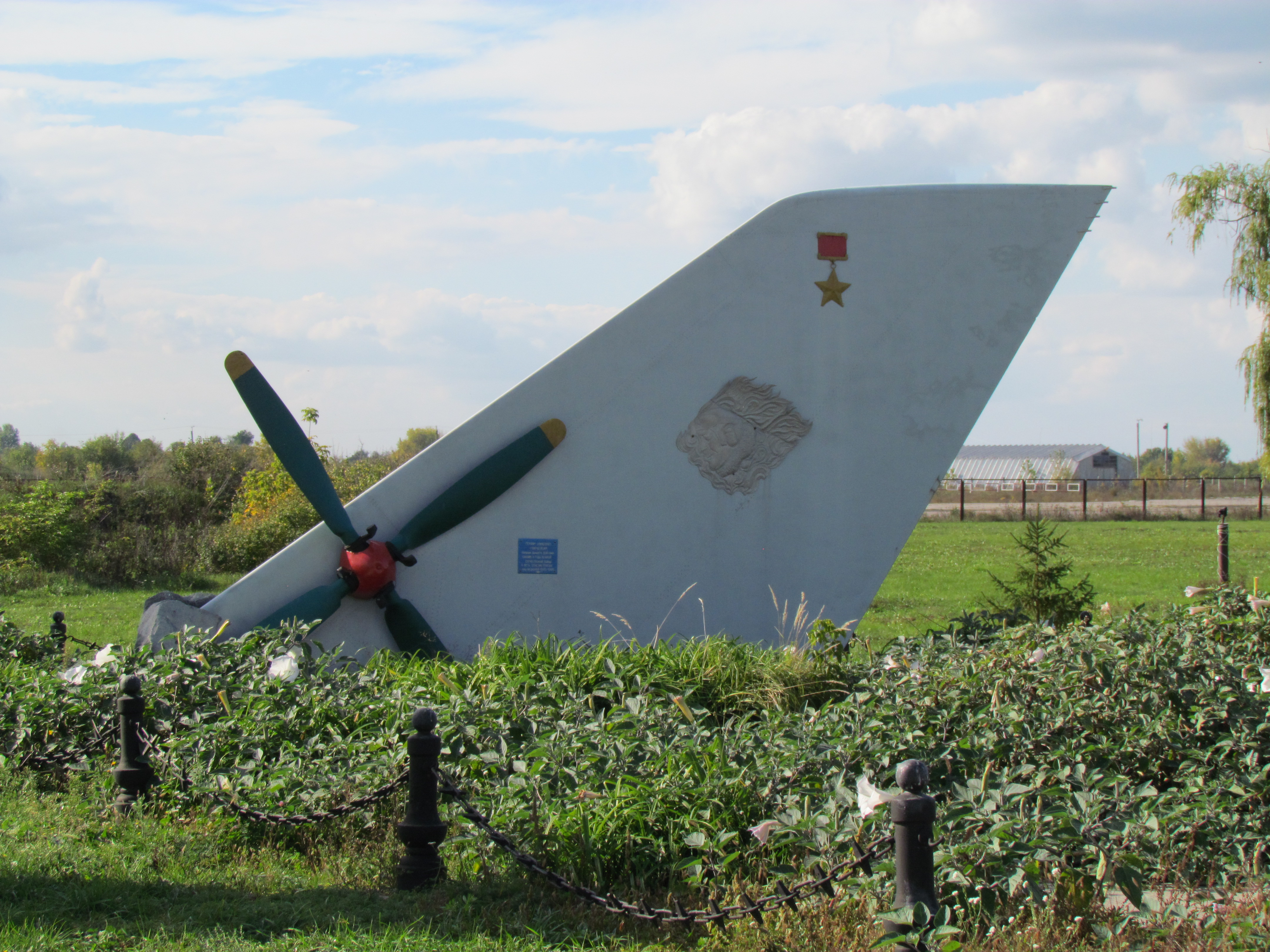
50th Year Commemoration Monument to the Fallen Airmen in Operation Frantic

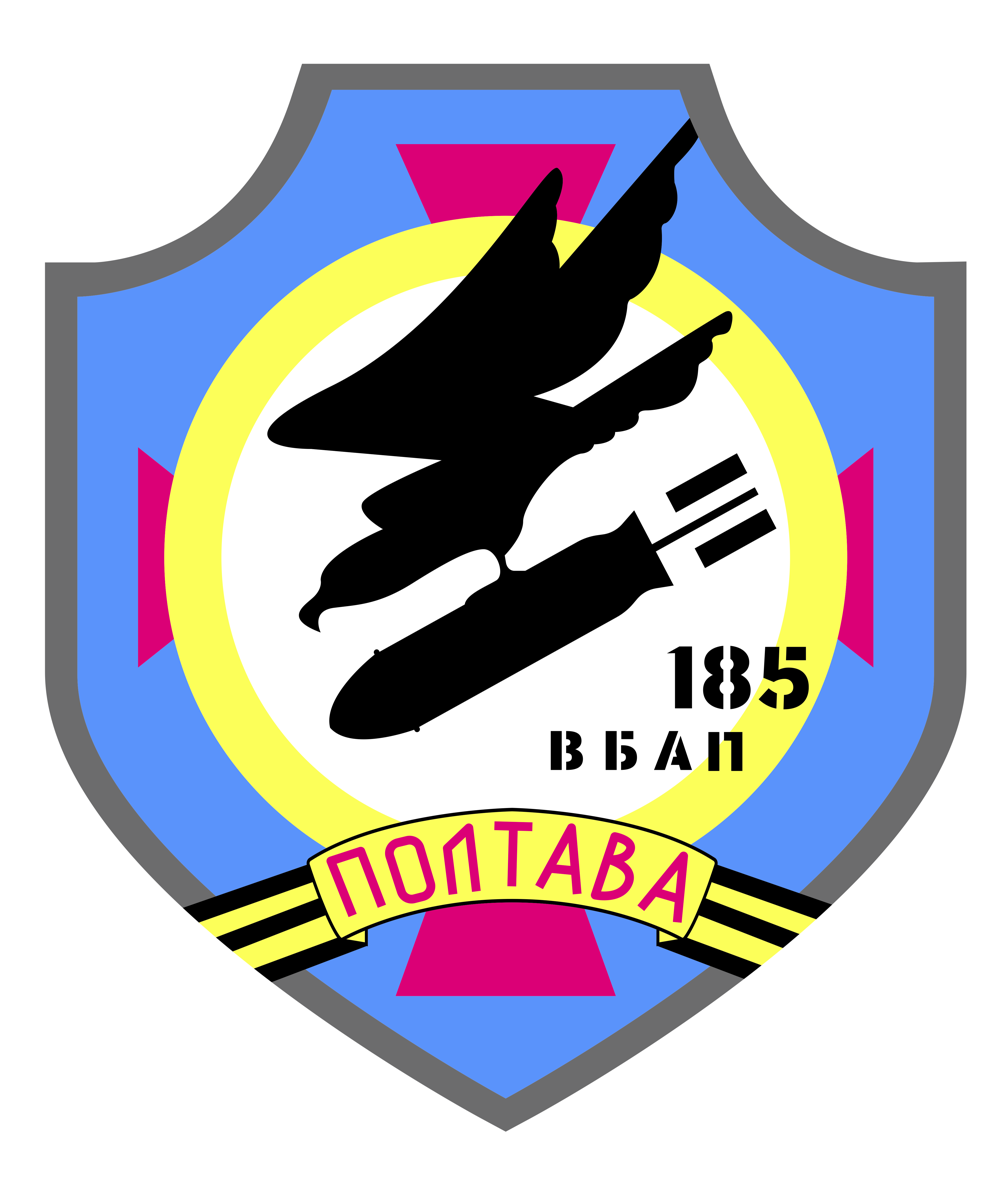
185th TBAP.

== Interesting facts ==
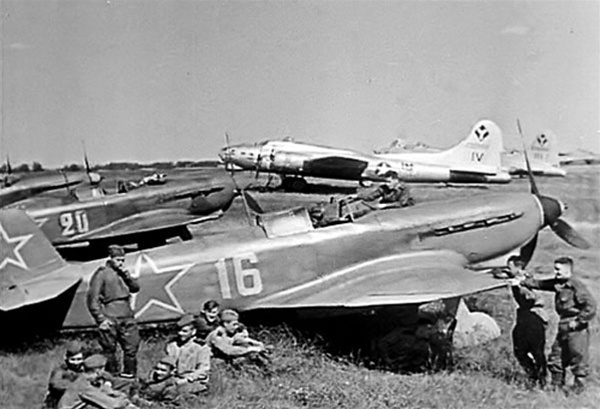
Flying Fortresses and Soviet aircraft of the cover, Poltava Air Base, 1944 h.

External images
- Celebrations of the 50th anniversary Operation Frantic
- McDonnell Douglas KC-10A Extender, Airbase "Poltava-4", 1994.
- Boeing B-52H Stratofortress, airbase "Poltava-4", 1994.
- Rockwell B-1B Lancer, airbase "Poltava-4", 1994.
- Boeing B-52H Stratofortres and Rockwell B-1B Lancer, Air Base "Poltava-4, 1994.

- In 1994, 50th anniversary of the beginning of the 50th anniversary of the "Poltava-4" airbase took place in the territory of Operation Frantic – a joint Soviet-American military operation with shuttle flights of American Boeing B-17 Flying Fortress heavy bombers to bomb Nazi Germany and its satellite states. During the celebration, the following US Air Force aircraft were present: ll Douglas KC-10A Extender, Boeing B-52H Stratofortress and B-1B Lancer.
- The museum and airbase were one of the sites of the book Georgy Savitsky "Field of battle – Ukraine. Broken Trident "(2009).

== See also ==
- Ukrainian Long Range Aviation
- Ukraine State Aviation Museum
- Aviation Technical Museum (Lugansk)
- Military Historical Museum of Ukrainian Air Force
- Ryazan Museum of Long-Range Aviation
