= Pryluky Air Base =

Military airport in Chernihiv Oblast, Ukraine

Pryluky Прилуки
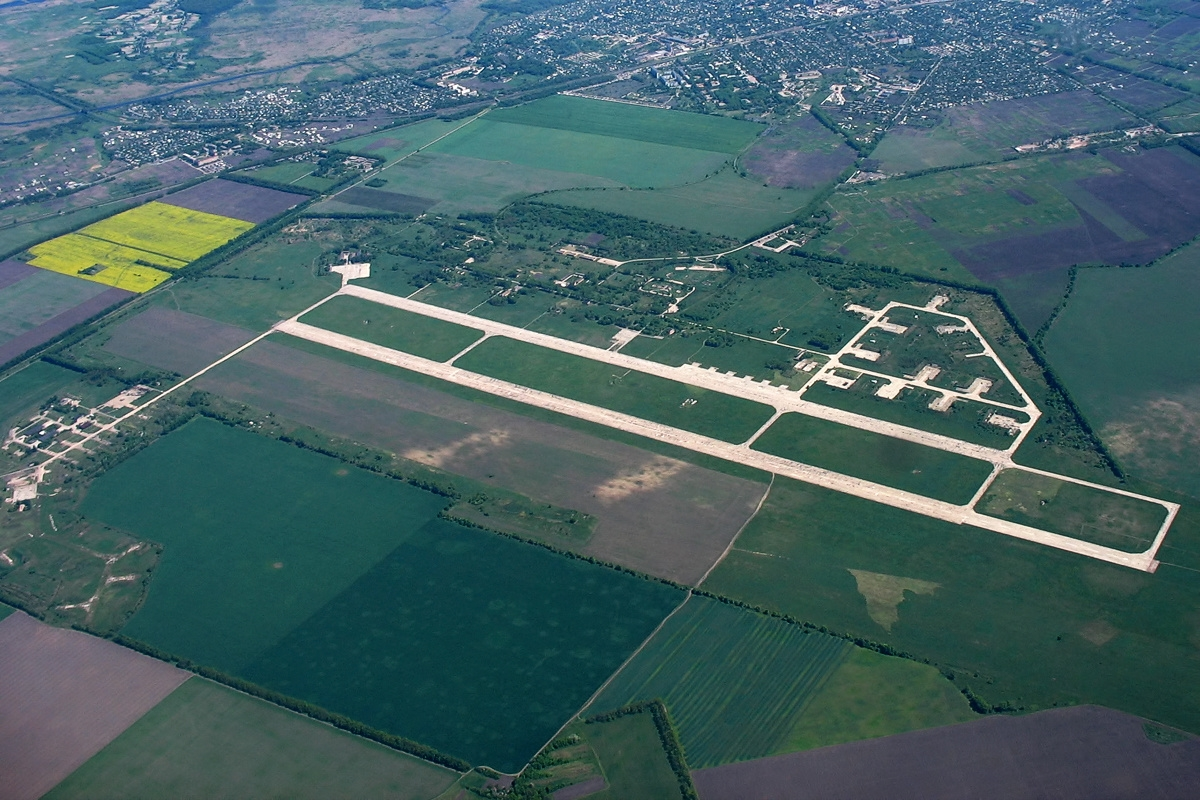
- IATA: none; ICAO: UKBP

Summary
- Airport type: Military
- Operator: Ukrainian Air Force
- Location: Pryluky
- Elevation AMSL: 449 ft / 137 m
- Coordinates: 50°34′0″N 032°19′0″E

Maps
- Shown within Chernihiv Oblast UKBP (Ukraine)
- Interactive map of Pryluky

Runways
Direction	Length		Surface
Direction	ft	m	Surface
17R/35L	9,842	3,000	Concrete (80 m or 260 ft wide)
17L/35R	8,200	2,500	Concrete (70 m or 230 ft wide)

Pryluky (Ukrainian: Прилуки) is an air base in Chernihiv Oblast, Ukraine located 6 km west of Pryluky. This airfield was primary Tupolev Tu-160 bomber base (with Uzyn hosting the Tupolev Tu-95 fleet). There are revetments for 20 large aircraft.

== History ==
In April 1946, the 184th Guards Heavy Bomber Aviation Regiment (184 GvTBAP) arrived at Priluky, after being renamed from 9th Guards Long-Range Regiment. It flew Tu-4s from 1950, Tu-16 aircraft beginning in 1955, then acquired the Tupolev Tu-22M4 in 1984 and the Tu-160 from 1987 until 2000. It also flew the Tu-134UBL trainer.

Pryluky accepted the USSR's first Tu-160 (Blackjack) in April 1987, building its fleet up to 19 by 1994. By the mid 1990s, the Pryluky Regiment had lost its value as a combat unit. The 184th GvTBAP's 19 "Blackjacks" were effectively grounded because of a lack of technical support, spare parts and fuel. At this point in time, Ukraine considered the Tu-160s more of a bargaining chip in their economic negotiations with Russia. Certainly, they were of very limited value to Ukraine from a military standpoint, but discussions with Russia concerning their return bogged down. Between October 1999 and February 2000 Ukraine turned over 8 Tu-160 bombers to Russia to pay off energy debts; these are now at Russia's Engels-2 air base. The last of Ukraine's strategic bombers, a Tu-160, was destroyed by agreement with the United States in February 2001.

As of 2012, the Pryluky airbase is abandoned. Almost all equipment has been dismantled, including radar and lighting equipment. At the request of the United States, earthen revetments, bomb shelters, two fuel and lubricant depots, and other facilities at the air base were also destroyed. A Tupolev Tu-16 monument still remains.
