= Operation Spiderweb =

2025 Ukrainian military operation in Russia

- Part of the Attacks in Russia during the Russo-Ukrainian war
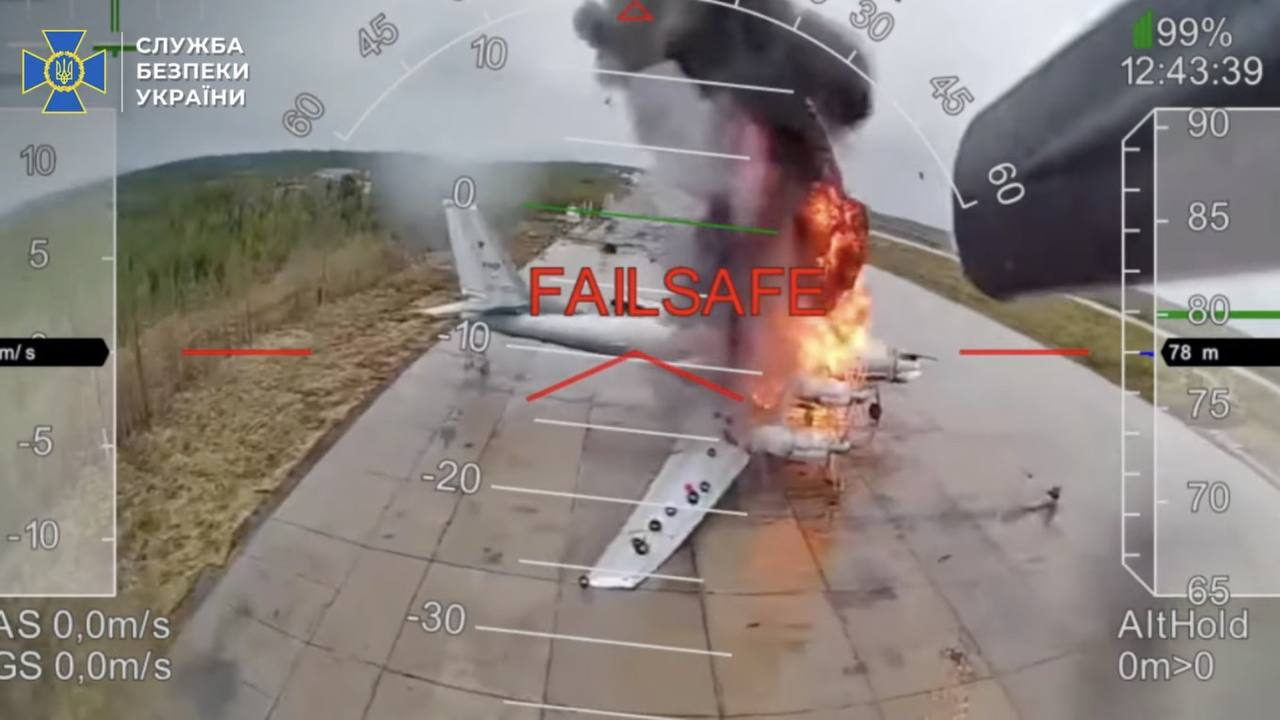
- A Tu-95 on fire at the Olenya airbase after being struck by drones
- Location: Olenya, Dyagilevo, Ivanovo, Belaya, and Ukrainka airbases, Russia
- Target: Russian Air Force
- Date: 1 June 2025
- Executed by: Security Service of Ukraine
- Outcome: 10–11 Tu-95MS and Tu-22M3 destroyed (per The War Zone); 20 military aircraft hit, 10 of which were destroyed (per US); 41 military aircraft hit (per the Security Service of Ukraine), at least 13 military aircraft destroyed (per NSDCU)

Operation Spiderweb (Note: Alternatively referred to as Operation Spider's Web) (Ukrainian: Операція «Павутина», romanized: Operátsija "Pavutýna") was a covert drone attack carried out by the Security Service of Ukraine (SBU) deep inside Russia on 1 June 2025, during the Russo-Ukrainian War. The coordinated strikes targeted the Russian Air Force's Long-Range Aviation assets at five air bases—Belaya, Dyagilevo, Ivanovo Severny, Olenya, and Ukrainka—using drones concealed in and launched from trucks on Russian territory.

It was the largest drone attack on Russian air bases up to that point in the war, employing 117 drones, according to Ukrainian officials. According to two US officials speaking to Reuters, about twenty military aircraft were hit in the attack, ten of which were destroyed. Russia confirmed that the attack took place. The operation was notable for its unprecedented geographical reach—spanning five oblasts across five time zones—particularly the strike on Belaya Air Base in Eastern Siberia, where damage was confirmed 4,300 km (2,700 mi) from Ukraine.

== Preparation ==
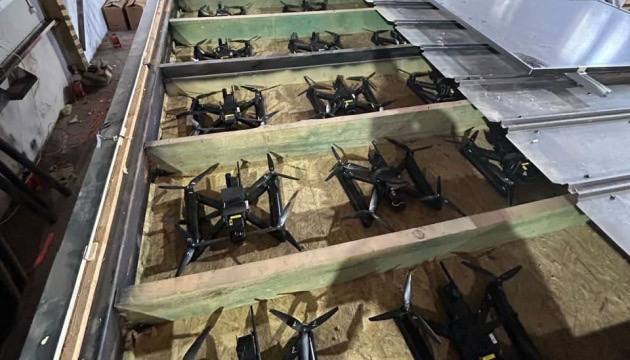
FPV drones placed in containers before being carried in trucks to launch points to attack Russian military airfields.

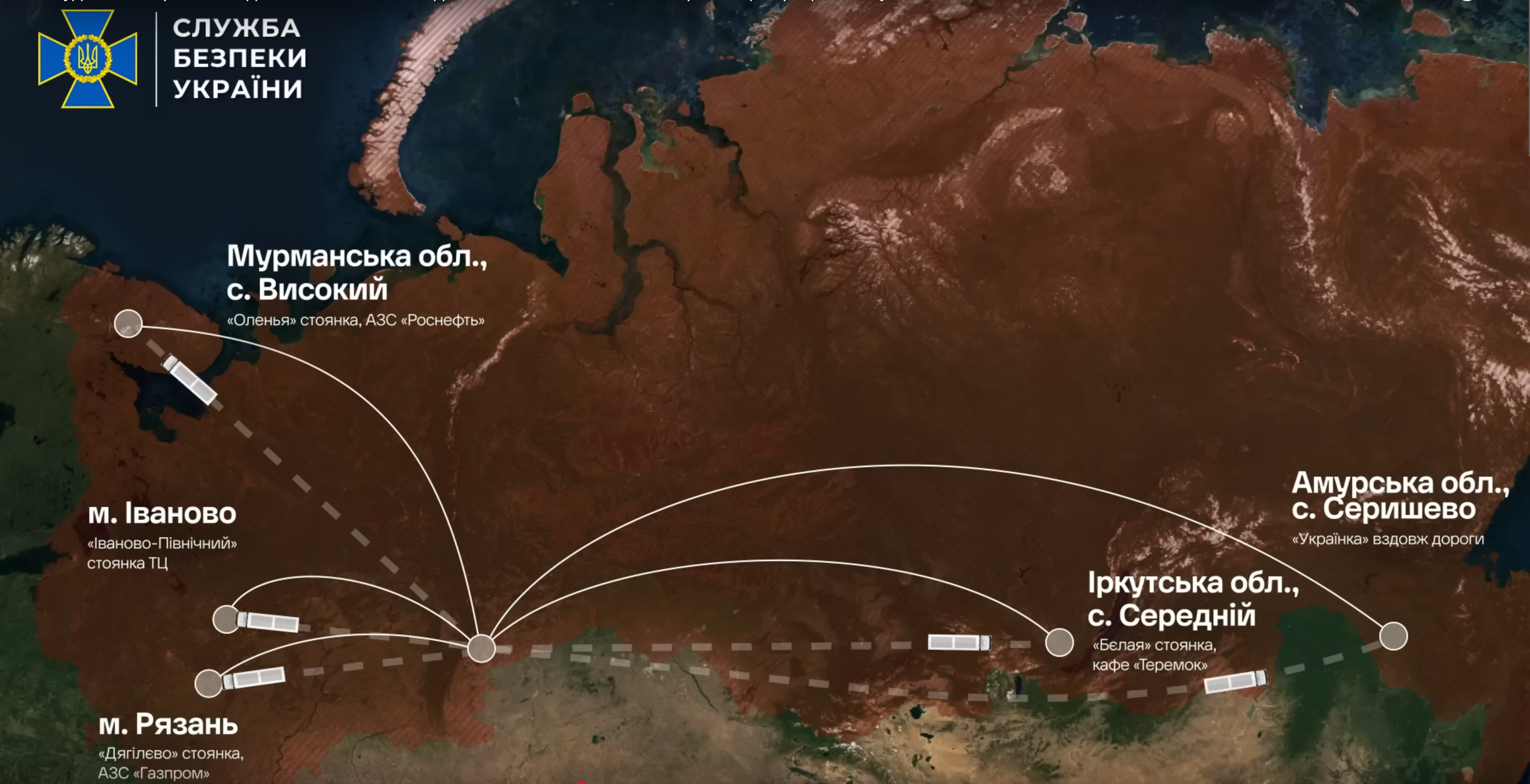
SBU schematic map illustrating the truck transports of drones from Chelyabinsk to the five targeted airbases

Ukrainian president Volodymyr Zelenskyy said that it took 18 months and 9 days from the start of planning to execution of the operation. American and Ukrainian sources say that the United States was not informed in advance about the attacks. According to Ukrainian sources, the plan for the "extremely complex" operation was implemented by the SBU head Vasyl Malyuk and his staff, and progress was personally supervised by Zelenskyy.

The drones were Ukrainian-made Osa ("Wasp") quadcopters, each with a payload of just over 3.2 kilograms (7.1 lb). In Russia, approximately 36 were transferred into compartments below the roofs of each of several wooden containers built to resemble regular mobile wooden cabins, which are routinely transported on flatbed trucks with the roofs uncovered. The Wall Street Journal later reported that more than 100 quadcopters had been smuggled in parts into and assembled in Russia.

The SBU published photos showing the drones being hidden under the cabin roofs inside a warehouse, later known to have been in Chelyabinsk, about 150 km north of the Russia–Kazakhstan border. The wooden sheds were loaded onto trucks, and unsuspecting Russian drivers were hired to drive each truck across Russia towards its target destination. Once the trucks were nearing their targets each driver received a phone call telling them where to stop. As soon as the truck stopped (or just before) the roof was raised by remote control and the drones took off. The drones from one of the trucks were attacked by shocked onlookers with stones and small arms fire, the only direct action taken against them.

Reuters has found the location where one truck stopped along the P-255 highway 7 km from the Belaya airbase. Citing the Baza news service, Reuters reported that Russian authorities suspect a 37-year-old Ukrainian national who had moved to Chelyabinsk and opened a freight business there in October 2024, and in December acquired several trucks, from which the drones were eventually launched.

The drones were guided to their targets remotely, using the open source software ArduPilot, which supports navigation via dead reckoning. Zelenskyy said that each drone had its own pilot to launch and command it remotely. One analyst explained that the drones were operated via dead reckoning without the need for satellite navigation, making them impervious to jamming of such navigation signals. The analyst suggested that the drones were using SIM cards for digital communication and position information over local mobile telephone networks, allowing control by a pilot far away and supporting high-resolution video.

However, to counteract the time delay inevitable in communication over long distances, and cope with temporary loss of the control signal, the devices supported artificial intelligence (AI) to be used in these cases, using the latest version of automatic target recognition technology known for many years.

The AI had to be trained in preparation for the operation to teach it to correctly identify its target aircraft and to guide the drone to its vulnerable spots. The Tu-22M3s in the Poltava Museum of Long-Range and Strategic Aviation were used for target recognition training.

Ukrainian sources said that the agents who prepared the operation on Russian territory were evacuated before the attacks began.

== Strikes ==
Targeted airbases (destruction, attack, no attack) and the truck launch inside Russia:
1 Olenya
2 Ivanovo Severny
3 Ukrainka
4 Belaya
5 Dyagilevo
6 Chelyabinsk (truck launch)

As many as 117 first-person view (FPV) Ukrainian drones targeted five Russian airbases: Belaya, Dyagilevo, Ivanovo Severny, Olenya, and Ukrainka. The SBU claims to have hit more than 40 Russian military aircraft, including Tu-160, Tu-95, and Tu-22M strategic bombers, and A-50 airborne early warning and control aircraft. One drone's footage showed it landing on a Tu-95 bomber's wing close to the fuel tanks; that of others soon followed. The drones attacked with very high precision; each pilot, working from Ukraine, aimed at vulnerable points such as fuel tanks in the wings. Video released by SBU show Tu-95 bombers armed with Kh-101 cruise missiles being destroyed; the large fireballs also imply that the tanks were full, suggesting that the aircraft had been prepared to conduct strikes.

Immediately following the attacks, Russian officials announced a state of emergency at Engels and Morozovsk air bases. Zelenskyy said that an 'office' for the operation was located near an office of the Russian Federal Security Service (FSB), and that 34% of Russia's strategic cruise missile carriers stationed at airbases had been hit.

=== Olenya ===
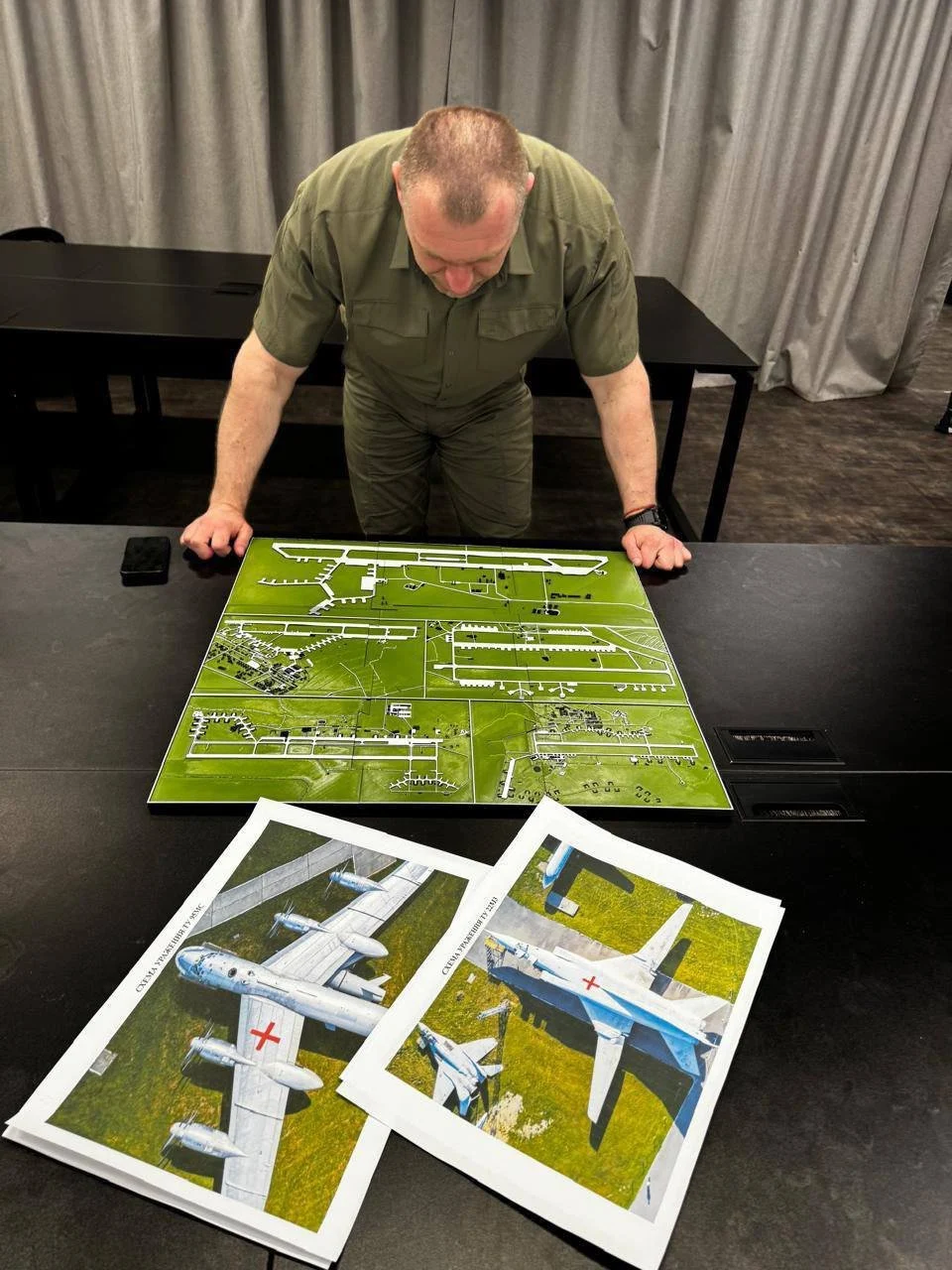
SBU head Vasyl Malyuk viewing satellite images of Russian military airfields (clockwise: Olenya, Ivanovo Severny, Ukrainka, Belaya, and Dyagilevo) and photos of strategic bombers Tu-95MS (left) and Tu-22M3 (right). The X's mark their most vulnerable areas.

Direct footage from SBU FPV drones striking Russian bombers on Olenya, Ivanovo, Dyagilevo, and Belaya airfields.

Full path of one of the drones from the moment it took off from the roof of a modular building to the destruction of a Russian bomber Tu-22M3 at the Belaya airfield.

In May 2025 media reported about the mass deployment of strategic aviation aircraft to the Olenya air base, south of Murmansk and according to the OSINT project AviVector, as of May 26, two Tu-95MSs, three Tu-160s, and two Su-34s were based at the airbase.

The attack on Olenya was carried out with the drones launching from a truck at a gas station. There were at least 10 explosions. The authorities forbade the public from entering or leaving Olenegorsk. Residents of Olenegorsk reported explosions and fire with a video of the aftermath being later published. Russian media reported the attack at Olenya but said that air defences were working.

According to OSINT analyses by Jane's Intelligence and others, four Tu-95 bombers and one An-12 transport plane were destroyed at Olenya.

=== Ivanovo Severny ===
An attack was reported on the Ivanovo Severny air base near Ivanovo, but local authorities did not report the attack. The Ivanovo base was previously struck on 23 May 2025. According to The Moscow Times, the A-50 was likely hit here. On 3 June, The Daily Telegraph reported to have viewed a three-minute-long video showing the radar domes of two A-50s at Ivanovo Severny being struck. On 4 June the Security Service of Ukraine published video footage claimed to be from Ivanovo Severny in which two FPV drones touch down on two A-50 radar domes. It is unclear if the A-50s damaged were in a usable state, with at least one missing engines and both having worn radomes.

=== Ukrainka ===
The attack on the Ukrainka air base (near Seryshevo in Amur Oblast) failed when the truck carrying the drones caught fire and exploded.

=== Belaya ===
An attack was carried out on the Belaya air base, in Irkutsk Oblast, confirmed by local residents and governor Igor Kobzev, who said that there was a "drop on an old building" in Novomaltinsk. As at Olenya, the drones were launched from trucks. This was the first Ukrainian strike in Siberia during the war. The 200th Guards Heavy Bomber Aviation Brest Red Banner Regiment, armed with Tu-22M3 strategic bombers, is stationed at the airbase. The governor showed footage of a plume of smoke. According to the OSINT project AviVector, the day before the attack there were 52 strategic aircraft (35 Tu-22M3 bombers, 6 Tu-95MS bombers, and 7 Tu-160 bombers), 30 MiG-31 fighters, and 8 auxiliary and transport aircraft at the airbase.

On 2 June, OSINT analysis of commercial satellite photos confirmed three destroyed Tu-95 bombers, one possibly damaged Tu-95, a destroyed Tu-22M3 bomber, and three possibly destroyed Tu-22M3 bombers. On 4 June, combined analysis of synthetic aperture radar and Maxar satellite imagery showed destruction of four Tu-22M3 and three Tu-95MS as well as one possibly damaged Tu-95MS.

=== Dyagilevo ===
Attacks were reported on the Dyagilevo airfield near Ryazan. The local governor confirmed the attack and stated that a fragment of a drone that had been shot down damaged the roof of a residential building, with no injuries. At least seven explosions were reported. The Tu-95MS and Tu-22M3 bombers based there were not hit; only grass was burnt.

=== Total aircraft damage ===
Although Ukraine appears to have targeted and damaged Tu-160s, some analysts believe Russia's Tu-160 fleet is largely still intact.

Bomb damage assessment (sources above)
Tu-95 type		Tu-22M3	An-12	A-50	Aircraft
Olenya	Belaya	Belaya	Olenya	Ivanovo Severny	Total
4	3–4	4	1	2 (targeted)	12–13 + 2 targeted

== Aftermath ==
Ukrainian officials said that the strikes damaged one-third of Russia's strategic cruise missile carriers, estimated to be worth US$7 billion, with drones that cost Ukraine $2000 each. The Institute for the Study of War noted in its initial analysis that Russia's capacity to launch long-range missiles and drones into Ukraine may have been at least temporarily constrained. The Tupolev Tu-95MS and Tupolev Tu-22M3 bombers have been out of production for decades and cannot be replaced. Long Range Aviation's strategic nuclear capability appears to have been severely degraded. The Wall Street Journal suggested that the failure of intelligence to forestall the attacks could increase what it called the "paranoia" of Russian president Vladimir Putin and lead to yet more purges in Russia's domestic intelligence services. Some commentators and Russian military bloggers called the event Russia's Pearl Harbor.

The Russian Ministry of Defence referred to the operation as a "terrorist attack", noting attacks on air bases in five regions of Russia but claiming that the attacks had been repelled in three of the regions. It confirmed damage to aircraft at the Olenya and Belaya air bases.

The TASS news agency reported that a truck driver alleged to be involved in the attack was to be questioned by police. The Russian defence ministry said that there were no casualties in the attacks they admitted, in the regions of Murmansk and Irkutsk, and that several "participants" had been arrested, although President Zelenskyy said that all operatives had safely been withdrawn from Russia. The BBC, citing unverified reports on Russian Telegram channel Baza, known for its links to the Russian security services, said that the drivers of the drone trucks all told similar stories of innocently delivering purported wooden cabins, receiving instructions on where to park the trucks by mobile phone. One driver interviewed by Russian state news agency Ria Novosti said he and other drivers were surprised by the emerging drones, and tried to knock them down by throwing stones. It was later confirmed that four of the truck drivers had been detained and faced charges of terrorism; the fifth driver died when his truck caught fire. As of January 2026, at least two remain in pre-trial detention and face potential sentences of 12 to 20 years. In September 2026 Moscow City Court released the four drivers due to lack of evidence on their involvement.

An article published by Russia's Pravda.ru pointed out that attacks on nuclear-capable aircraft could undermine the effectiveness of Russia's nuclear forces, and "According to the 'Basic Principles of the State Policy of the Russian Federation on Nuclear Deterrence,' such actions fall under conditions that may justify the use of nuclear weapons".

On 4 June 2025, U.S. president Donald Trump initiated a long call with Putin which dealt mainly with the attack. "I just finished speaking, by telephone, with President Vladimir Putin, of Russia," Trump wrote on Truth Social. "The call lasted approximately one hour and 15 minutes. We discussed the attack on Russia's docked [sic] airplanes, by Ukraine, and also various other attacks that have been taking place by both sides." He stated that Putin told him that Russia would retaliate. The Kremlin confirmed the phone call, but a transcript has not been released and the Moscow-Washington hotline was not mentioned.

On 6 June 2025, it was reported in Newsweek that the Ukrainian Air Force had said that "Russia used a Tu-160 in intensive overnight missile and drone strikes across Ukraine", following a report by Ukraine's militarnyi that the Russian VKS had started using Tu-160 bombers to launch 36 Kh-101 cruise missiles, due to the loss of Tu-95 bombers from the operation. Further, the report in Newsweek said that Russia had moved its strategic bomber force further east, potentially to reduce the risk of follow on attacks. However, former intelligence analyst Frank Ledwidge noted in the same article that the move could be part of a planned rotation or normal security move.

== Analysis ==
According to the Financial Times, the damaged and destroyed aircraft made up around 20% of Russia's operational long-range aviation fleet. Many of the aircraft types affected, such as the Tu-95 and Tu-22M3, have not been produced since the dissolution of the Soviet Union in 1991, making them impossible to replace and exceptionally difficult to repair. Military expert William Alberque said that replenishing these losses could take years or even decades, and that the attacks would force Russia to disperse its bomber fleet across multiple airbases, reducing its ability to carry out large-scale strikes aimed at overwhelming Ukrainian air defences. Many sources report that Russia "has relocated dozens of its strategic bombers to more remote airbases across the country". Fabian Hoffmann at the University of Oslo commented that the loss of the bombers attacked was particularly damaging as they were the most operational examples; many others were undergoing maintenance.

Wall Street Journal columnist Bernard-Henri Lévy compared the operation to Israel's pager attacks on Hezbollah fighters, describing it as one of the most ingenious military operations in history, one that would be studied for ages. He further said that the operation delivered one of the most significant blows to Russia during its invasion of Ukraine, alongside the 2022 sinking of the Moskva warship and attack on the Crimean bridge, retreat of the Russian Black Sea fleet to Novorossiysk due to vulnerability to Ukrainian attack, and the 2024 Kursk offensive.

== Gallery ==
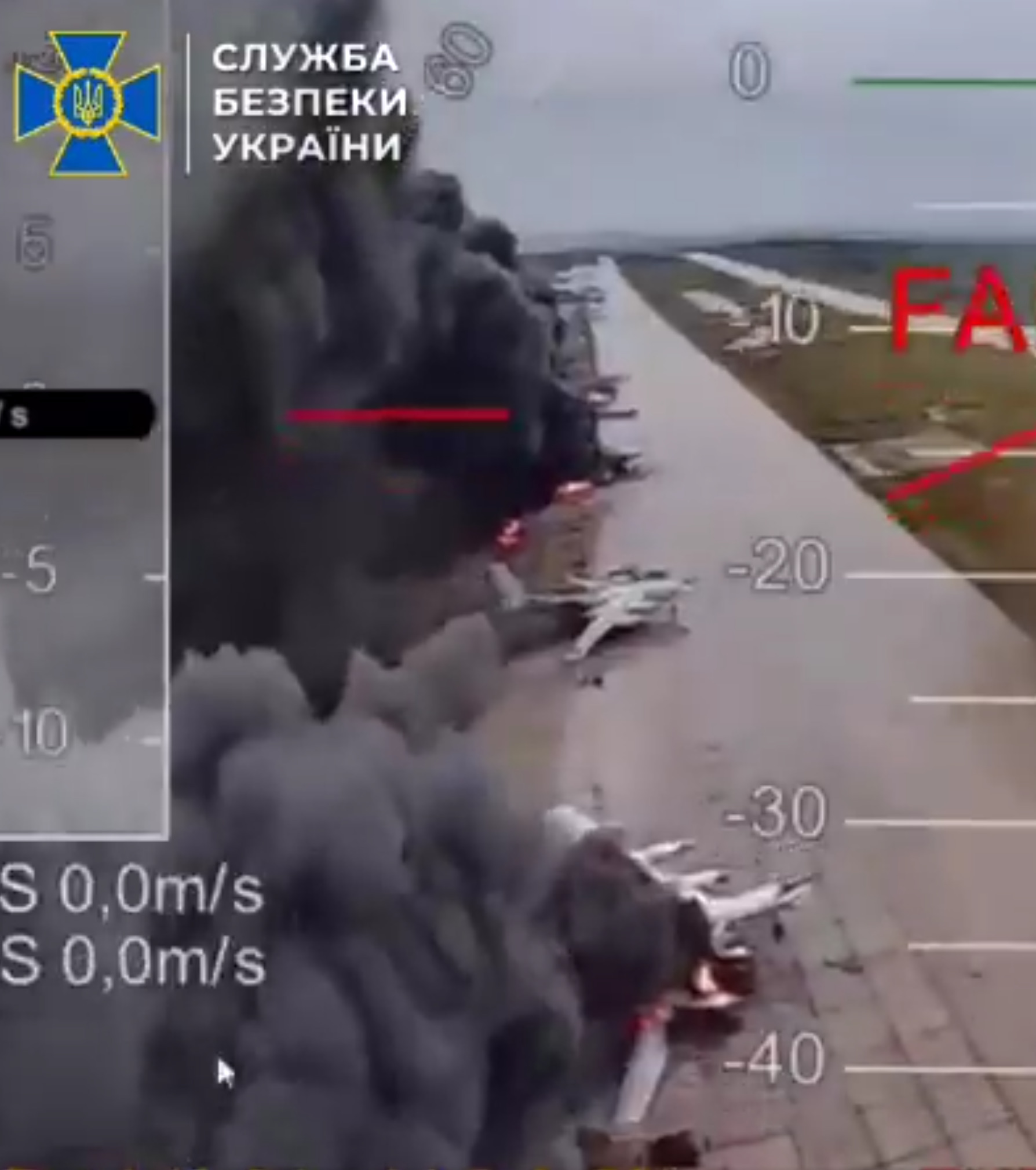
Burning Tu-95s at Olenya air base

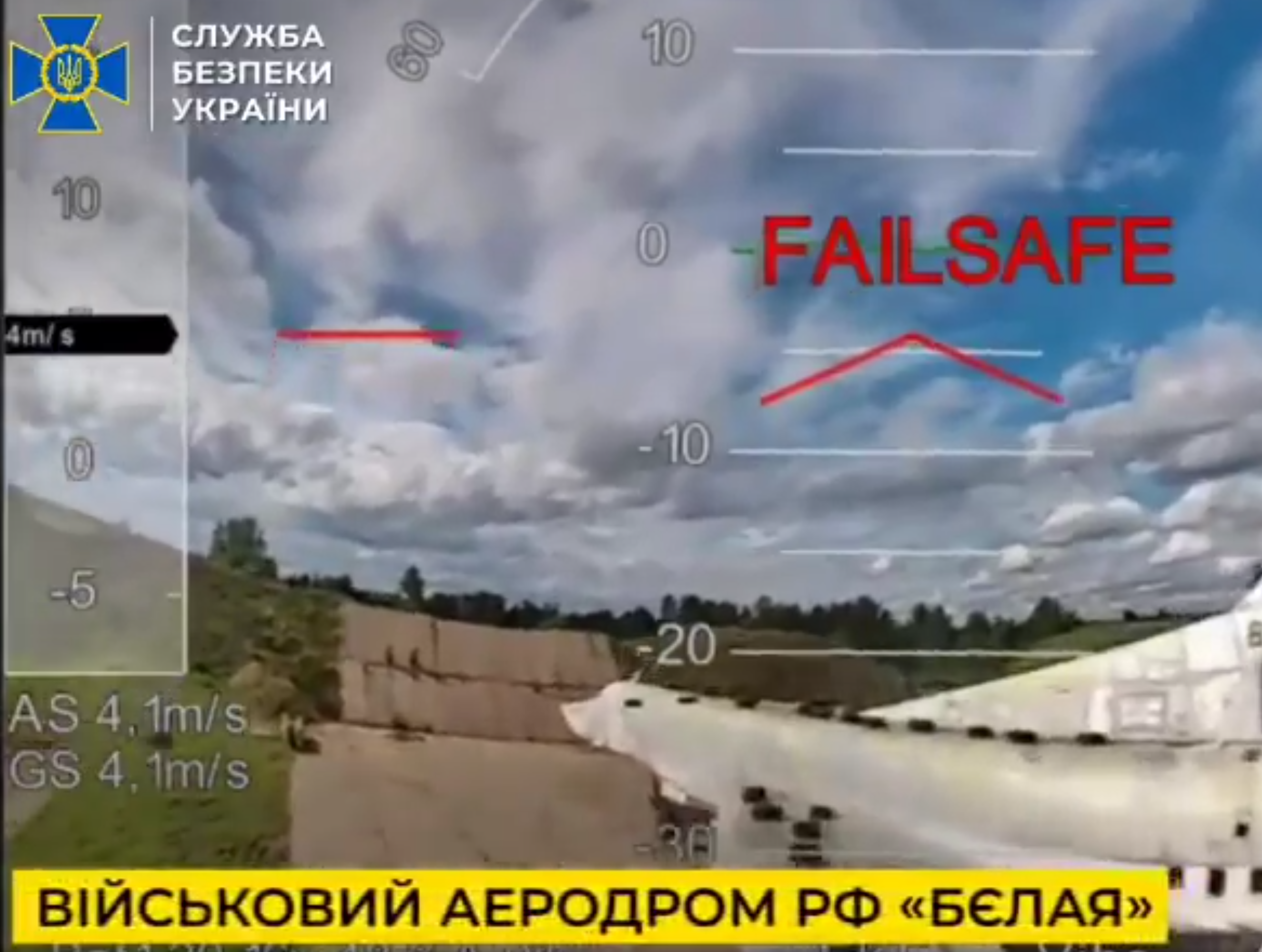
Tu-22M3 targeted at Belaya air base

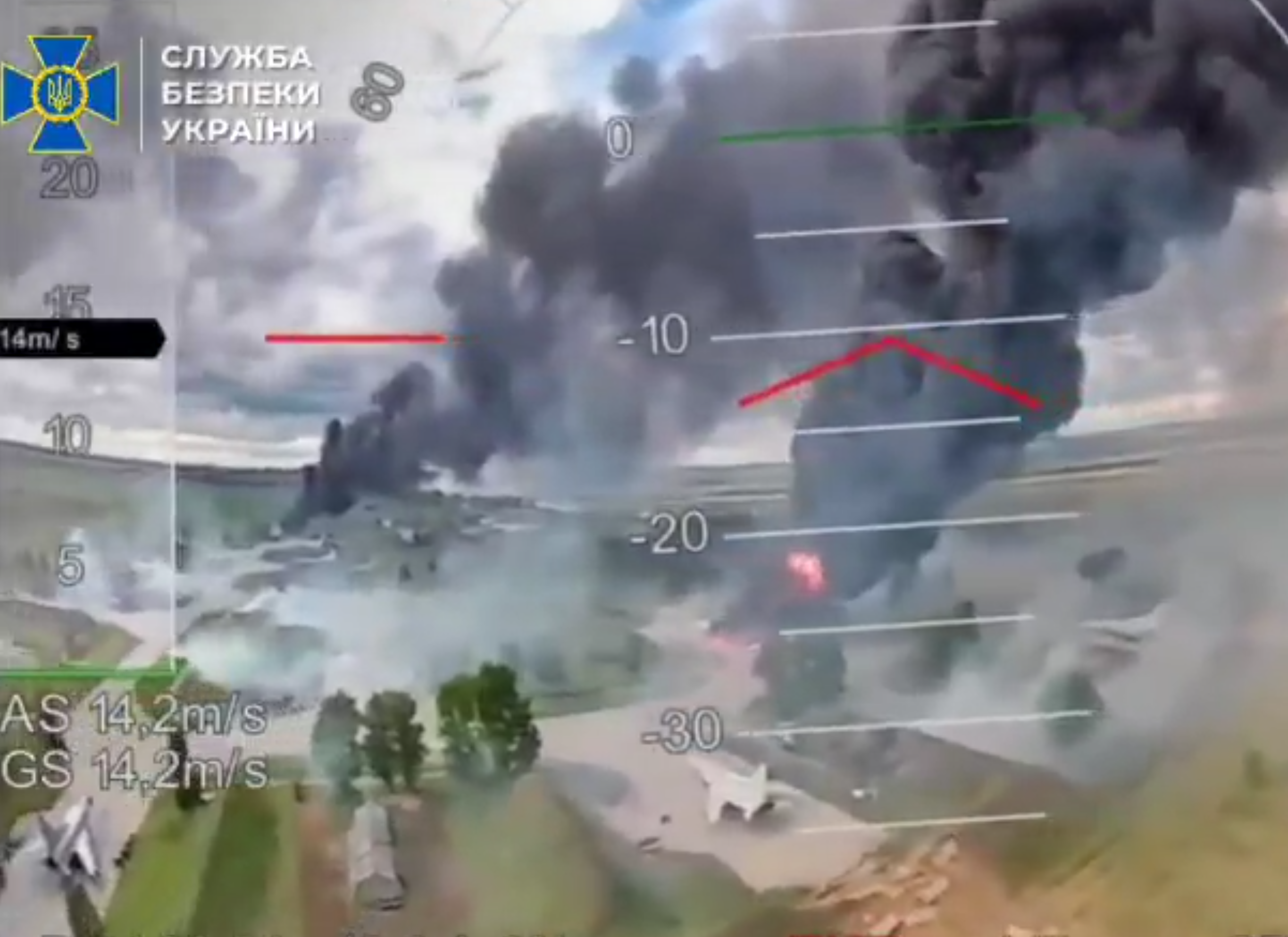
Belaya air base under attack

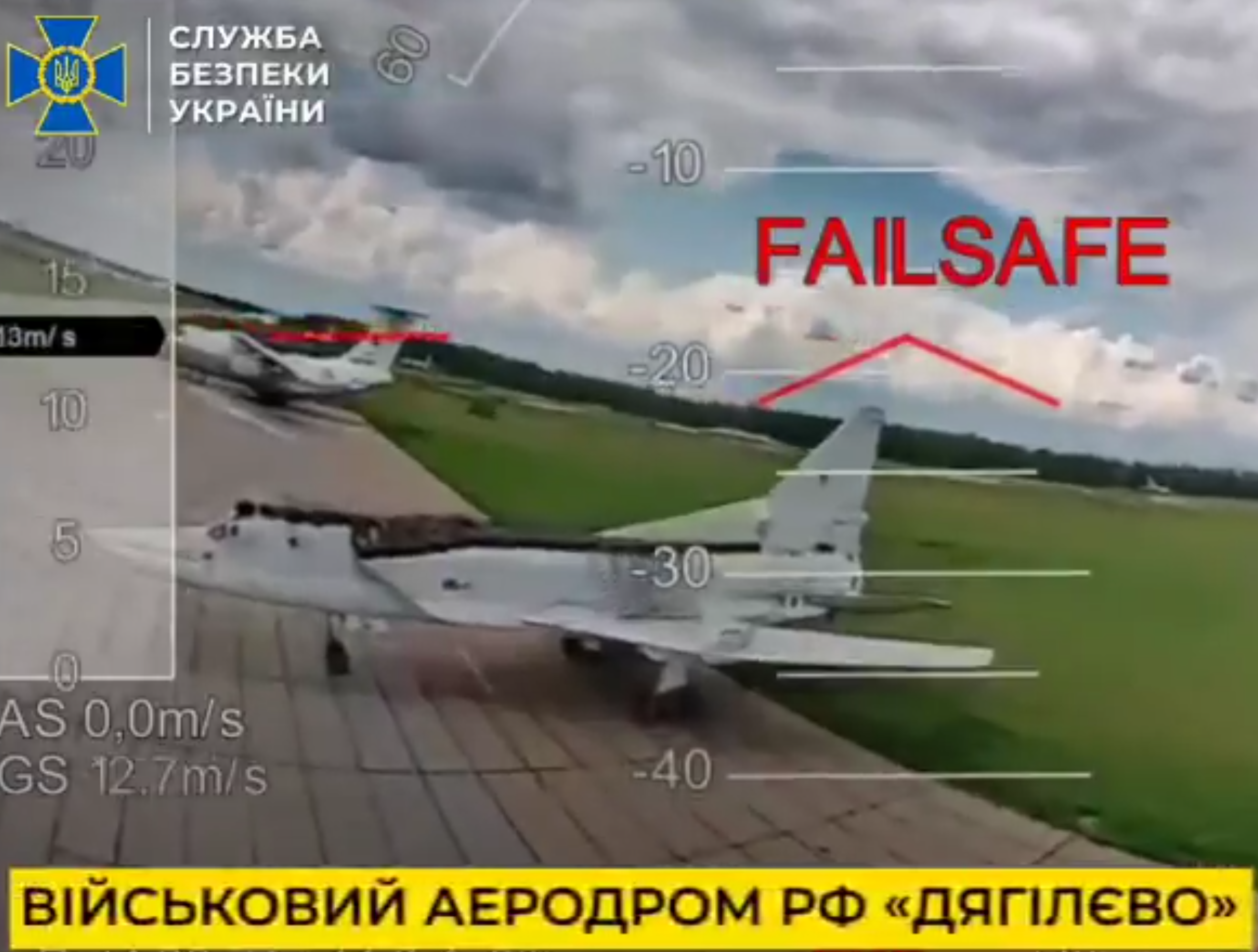
Tu-22M3 targeted at Dyagilevo air base

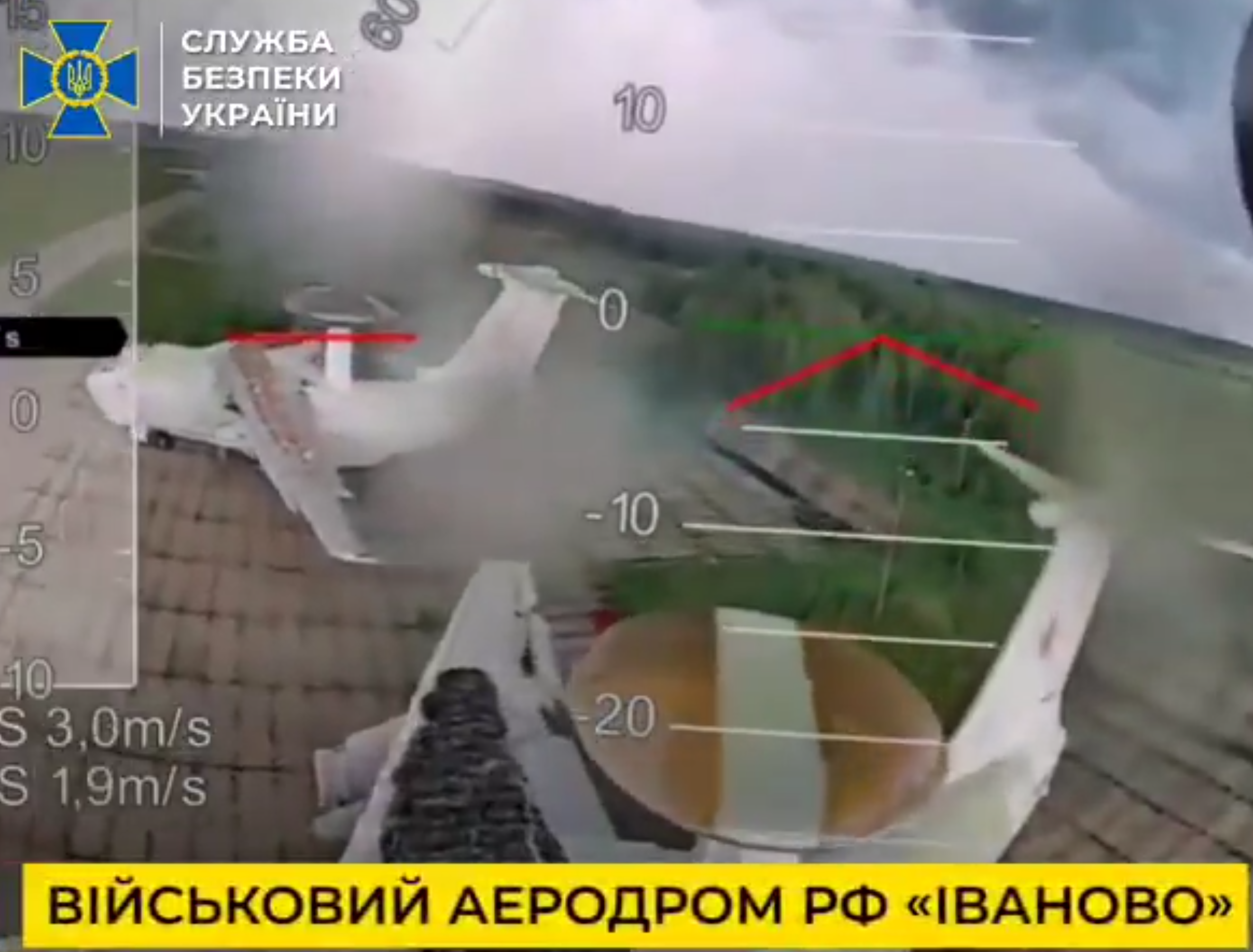
A-50 targeted at Ivanovo Severny air base

== See also ==
- 2025 Crimean Bridge explosion – Event in the Russian invasion of Ukraine
- Highway of Death (Ukraine), motorway on the land bridge between Crimea and Russia with frequent Ukrainian drone strikes on Russian military supply vehicles
