= Dolon Southwest =

Former dispersal bomber base in Semipalatinsk Oblast, Kazakh SSR

- IATA: none; ICAO: UASF

Summary
- Airport type: Military
- Operator: abandoned
- Location: Dolon, Semipalatinsk Oblast, Kazakhstan
- Elevation AMSL: 830 ft / 253 m
- Coordinates: 50°15′0″N 079°5′0″E
- Interactive map of Dolon Southwest

Runways
Direction	Length		Surface
Direction	ft	m	Surface
	13,123	4,000

Dolon Southwest was a dispersal bomber base in Semipalatinsk Oblast, Kazakhstan, located 43 km south-west of Dolon (air base). It was probably associated with the 8th independent Heavy Bomber Aviation Corps (1960 - 1980) and then the 37th Air Army VGK, of Soviet Long Range Aviation, because Dolon (air base) nearby was under those commands.

A Central Intelligence Agency document listed the coordinates of the airfield while referencing a 1968 deployment of 21 Tupolev Tu-16 "Badger" bombers, the first deployment of this aircraft at the airfield. Dolon was listed as having eight support buildings, a refueling facility, an instrument landing system, and ground controlled approach (GCA).

Almost no trace remains of the base.
