= Semipalatinsk Oblast, Kazakhstan =

KazSSR oblasts 1959

Semipalatinsk Oblast (Kazakh: Семей облысы / Semei oblysy; Russian: Семипалатинская область) was an administrative division of the Kazakh Soviet Socialist Republic in the Soviet Union, established on October 14, 1939 from parts of East Kazakhstan and Alma-Ata Oblasts. Upon Kazakhstan's independence in 1991, the oblast continued to exist until 1997, when it was merged back into East Kazakhstan Oblast. In 2022, the region was reconstituted as the Abai Region, with its administrative centre still located in Semey.

It contained the Semipalatinsk Test Site, Dolon (air base) and Dolon Southwest air base.
