= 37th Air Army =

- Active: 1949–1968, 1980–1988, 1998–2009
- Country: Soviet Union; Russia
- Branch: Soviet Air Forces; Russian Air Force
- Type: High Supreme Command
- Size: World War II: several air divisions 1998–2009: ~ 10 air regiments
- Garrison/HQ: Moscow

Commanders
- Notable commanders: Pyotr Deynekin; Pavel Androsov

The 37th Air Army (Russian: 37-я воздушная армия, romanized: 37 Vozdushnaya Armiya) of the High Supreme Command (Strategic Purpose) was the strategic bomber force of the Russian Air Force from 1998 to 2009. It was equipped with Tupolev Tu-95MS and Tu-160 armed with nuclear cruise missiles, and the intermediate range Tu-22M3 bombers.

It was the successor to the Soviet Union's Long Range Aviation, which once had several Air Armies, including the 37th. The 37th Air Army was originally formed in 1949 by redesignating the 4th Air Army in the Northern Group of Forces in Poland. It was active there until 1968. It was reformed by a decree of 13 March 1980, along with the 24th, 30th, and 46th Air Armies, which together replaced the Long Range Aviation headquarters, which was disbanded. It appears the decree may have been put into effect and the headquarters actually reformed on 1 August 1980.

Strategic aviation is the sole Russian Air Force component which was actually increased in the 1990s rather than being cut, as was the case with military services. Following the break-up of the Soviet Union in the early 1990s, only 22 Tu-95MS bombers remained on Russian territory; at that time the only Tu-160s were in test units or with the manufacturers. However, manufacture of the Tu-160 continued, and between 1992 and 1995, the Engels regiment received six Tu-160s before the production rate slowed considerably. More aircraft, 43 Tu-95MS, and 8 Tu-160s were exchanged, or bought back from Kazakhstan and Ukraine. The Russian Air Force currently has 64 Tu-95MS and 16 Tu-160 bombers, and these are being upgraded by changing the navigation and fire-control suites and installing new weapons, including non-nuclear cruise missiles, Kh-101/102 and standoff missiles.

In 2007, for the first time in 15 years, the annual flight time of pilots of the 37th Air Army (Long-Range Aviation) exceeded 80 hours.

On September 10, 2008, two Tu-160 bombers made a flight from their airbase to an aerodrome (Libertador) in Venezuela, using their home airbase of Olenegorsk in the Murmansk area. On board were training rockets with which the sortie's task was fulfilled. It is the first case of use in the history of the Russian Federation by Long-Range Aviation aircraft of airbases located in the territory of the foreign state. While in Venezuela the aircraft made training flights over neutral waters in the Atlantic Ocean and Caribbean sea.

In 2009 the 37th Air Army of the Supreme Command was disbanded as part of a large scale reorganisation of the Air Force and has been reformed into the Long Range Aviation Command.

== List of structure by year ==
=== 2007 ===
- 37th Air Army – Moscow
  - 43rd Centre for Combat and Flight Personnel Training – Ryazan – operates the Tu-22M3, Tu-95MS, Tu-134UBL and An-26;
  - 22nd Guards Heavy Bomber Aviation Division – HQ at Engels;
    - 121st Heavy Bomber Air Regiment – Engels – Tu-160 in service;
    - 184th Heavy Bomber Air Regiment – Engels – Tu-95MS;
    - 52nd Heavy Bomber Air Regiment – Shaykovka – Tu-22M3;
    - 840th Heavy Bomber Air Regiment – Soltsy – Tu-22M3;
  - 326th Heavy Bomber Aviation Division – HQ at Ukrainka;
    - 182nd Heavy Bomber Air Regiment – Ukrainka – Tu-95MS;
    - 79th Heavy Bomber Air Regiment – Ukrainka – Tu-95MS;
    - 200th Heavy Bomber Air Regiment – Belaya (near Irkutsk) – Tu-22M3, Tu-22MR;
    - 444th Heavy Bomber Air Regiment – Vozdvizhenka (Ussuriysk) – Tu-22M3;
  - 203rd Independent Aviation Regiment of Tanker Aircraft – HQs at Ryazan – Il-78 and Il-78M in service. Originally 412 AP flying Pe-8s in World War II. See Petlyakov Pe-8#Wartime operational service;
  - 181st Independent Air Squadron – Irkutsk – An-12 and An-30;
  - 199th Air Base – Ulan-Ude;
  - 3119th Air Base – Tambov;
  - Unknown Air Base – Tiksi;

=== 2000 ===
- Headquarters, Moscow
- 44th independent Communications Regiment (Moscow, Moscow Oblast)
- 43rd Center for combat training and retraining of crews (Ryazan, Ryazan Oblast) with Tu-22M3, Tu-134UBL and An-26
- 203rd Guards Aviation Regiment of Tanker Aircraft (Dyagilevo, Ryazan Oblast) with Il-78
- 6212th Aviation Technical Base for discarded aircraft (Engels, Saratov Oblast) with Tu-22
- 22nd Guards Heavy Bomber Aviation Division (Engels-2, Saratov Oblast)
- 326th Heavy Bomber Aviation Division (Ukrainka, Amur Oblast)

=== 1991 ===
- Headquarters, Moscow
- 364 Separate Mixed Aviation Squadron (Vorkuta, Komi ASSR)(transport aircraft, Mi-8s)
- 73rd Heavy Bomber Air Division (TBAD) at Ukrainka, Amur Oblast [activated 1957] with:
  - 40th TBAP (Ukrainka) with Tu-95K and Tu-95K-22 [activated 1957 with 3M bombers; early 1980s reequipped with Tu-95K from other units that converted to Tu-95MS]
  - 79th TBAP (Ukrainka) with Tu-95K and Tu-95K-22
- 79th Heavy Bomber Aviation Division at Dolon, Semipalatinsk area [activated 1957] with:
  - 1023rd Heavy Bomber Aviation Regiment (Dolon) with Tu-95MS [activated 1957 at Uzin, Kiev region, with Tu-95 from the 1006th TBAP; 1983 relocated to Dolon; 1983 reequipped with Tu-95MS as the first unit]
  - 1226th Heavy Bomber Aviation Regiment (Dolon) with Tu-95MS [activated 1957; reequipped with Tu-95 in the early 1970s, later Tu-95K; mid-1980s reequipped with Tu-95MS]

Total aircraft in division (1.1.91): 13 Tu-95MS-16 and 27 Tu-95MS-6

- 106th Heavy Bomber Aviation Division at Uzyn, Kyiv Oblast, activated May 1955, with:
  - 409th Aviation Regiment of Tanker Aircraft (APSZ) (Uzyn) with Ilyushin Il-78 tankers. Activated 1955 with Tu-95 as TBAP; reequipped with Il-78 tankers in 1986.
  - 1006th Heavy Bomber Aviation Regiment (Uzyn) with 21 Tu-95MS-16 [activated 1956 with Tu-95; 1957 reequipped with Tu-95K, and the old Tu-95 were transferred to the 1023rd TBAP; reequipped with Tu-95MS in 1985]
- 201st Heavy Bomber Aviation Division at Engels-2, Saratov Oblast
  - 182nd Guards Heavy Bomber Aviation Regiment (Mozdok, Severo-Osetinskaya ASSR)(Tu-95MS-16)
  - 184th Guards 'Poltava-Berlin' Heavy Bomber Aviation Regiment (Priluki, Chernigov Oblast)(Tupolev Tu-160 'Blackjack') (uk:Полтавсько-Берлінський полк дальньої авіації)
  - 1230th Air Refuelling Regiment (Engels-2)(3M2 tankers)

=== 1980 ===
Source: Holm

- ? independent Communications Regiment (Moscow, Moscow Oblast)
- 364th independent Mixed Aviation Squadron (Vorkuta, Komi ASSR) with Mi-8 and An-24/26
- 73rd Heavy Bomber Aviation Division (Ukrainka, Amur Oblast)
- 79th Heavy Bomber Aviation Division (Dolon, Semipalatinsk Oblast)
- 201st Heavy Bomber Aviation Division (Engels-2, Saratov Oblast)

=== 1960 – 1992 in Poland ===
Source: Web Site

37th Air Army (July 1964 renamed VVS Northern Group of Forces; February 22, 1968 awarded the Red Banner; April 4, 1968 renamed 4th Air Army; August 1980 renamed 4th Air Army VGK ON; October 1992 withdrawn from Legnica, Poland)

- 19th independent Communications Regiment and Automated Control Regiment (Legnica) – October 1992 withdrawn from Legnica, Poland
- 245th independent Mixed Aviation Squadron (Legnica) with Mi-4 (1960–1989), An-12, An-26, and Mi-8 – October 1992 withdrawn from Legnica, Poland
- 164th independent Guards Reconnaissance Aviation Regiment (Brzeg) with Il-28R (1960–1989), MiG-25 and Su-24 – October 1992 withdrawn from Legnica, Poland
- 330th independent Reconnaissance Regiment (Chojna) with MiG-15R – activated the 215th independent Aviation Squadron for Tactical Reconnaissance in 1960 and was disbanded
- 215th independent Aviation Squadron for Tactical Reconnaissance – activated from 330th independent Reconnaissance Regiment in 1960 (Brzeg) with MiG-21R (1960–1981), Yak-28PP (1981–1993), MiG-25BM (1989–1993), MiG-25RU (1989–1993), August 1984 renamed 151st independent Aviation Regiment for Electronic Warfare), 1992 taken over by Belorussia, disbanded January 1993
- 149th Fighter-Bomber Aviation Division (Szprotawa) (July 1982 renamed 149th Bomber Aviation Division) – July 1992 withdrawn from Poland
  - 3rd Fighter-Bomber Aviation Regiment (Krzywa) with Su-7B and MiG-17 (1965–1980), MiG-27 (1980–1988), Su-24M (1988–1992) – 1990 transferred to Lebyashe (Volgograd oblast), disbanded 1992
  - 18th Fighter-Bomber Aviation Regiment (Szprotawa) (1981 renamed 89th Fighter-Bomber Aviation Regiment) with MiG-17 (1965–1980), Su-17 (1980–1988), Su-24 (1988–1993) – 1992 transferred to Siverskaya (Novgorod oblast), disbanded 1993
  - 42nd Guards Fighter-Bomber Aviation Regiment (Zagan) with MiG-15F/PF (1965–1970), MiG-17 (1970–1980, MiG-21 (1980–1988), Su-24M (1988–1992) – disbanded 1992
- 239th Fighter Aviation Division (Kluczewo) – July 1992 withdrawn from Poland, disbanded May 1, 1998
  - 159th Guards Fighter Aviation Regiment (Kluczewo) with MiG-17 and Yak-25M (1960–1990), Su-27 (1990–1998) – 1992 transferred to Besovets (Karelskaja ASSR), disbanded 1998
  - 582nd Fighter Aviation Regiment (Chojna) with MiG-15 (1960–1990), Su-27 (1990–1992) – 1992 transferred to Smolensk, disbanded 1992
  - 871st Fighter Aviation Regiment (Kolobrzeg) with MiG-15, MiG-17, MiG-19, and MiG-21 (1960–1973), MiG-23MLD (1990–1992) – Brzheg, Poland, 1.9.89 - 10.6.91; June 1991 transferred to Smolensk, disbanded 1992
- 172nd Fighter-Bomber Aviation Division (Legnica), disbanded July 1961
  - 189th Guards Fighter-Bomber Aviation Regiment (Olawa) with MiG-15, MiG-17, disbanded July 1961
  - 669th Guards Fighter-Bomber Aviation Regiment (Szprotawa) with MiG-15, MiG-17, disbanded July 1961
  - 756th Guards Fighter-Bomber Aviation Regiment (Krzywa) with MiG-15, MiG-17, disbanded July 1961
- 183rd Bomber Aviation Division (Brzeg), disbanded July 1960
  - 131st Bomber Aviation Regiment (Poland), disbanded July 1960
  - 1101st Bomber Aviation Regiment (Brzeg), disbanded July 1960
  - 1107th Bomber Aviation Regiment (Brzeg), disbanded July 1960

== Commanders ==
Source: Michael Holm

- Lieutenant-General I. V. Gorbunov, 1980–1985
- Lieutenant-General Pyotr Stepanovich Deynekin, 1985–May 1988 (later Commander-in-Chief of the Russian Air Force)
- Lieutenant-General Igor Mikhailovich Kalugin, 1988–November 1997
- Lieutenant-General Mikhail Mikhailovich Oparin, 11.97 – 11.02
- Lieutenant-General Igor Ivanovich Khvorov, 15.11.02 – May 2007
- General-Major Pavel Androsov, 2007 - August 2009

Later commanders: Major General Anatoly Zhiharev, former Chief of Staff of the 37th Air Army.

== Sources ==
- Air Forces Monthly, July 2007.
- Aviaport.ru, a report on the Army's participation in an exercise during 2005
