= Orsha Airport =

Orsha Airport Orša-Balbasava Во́рша Aэрапорт
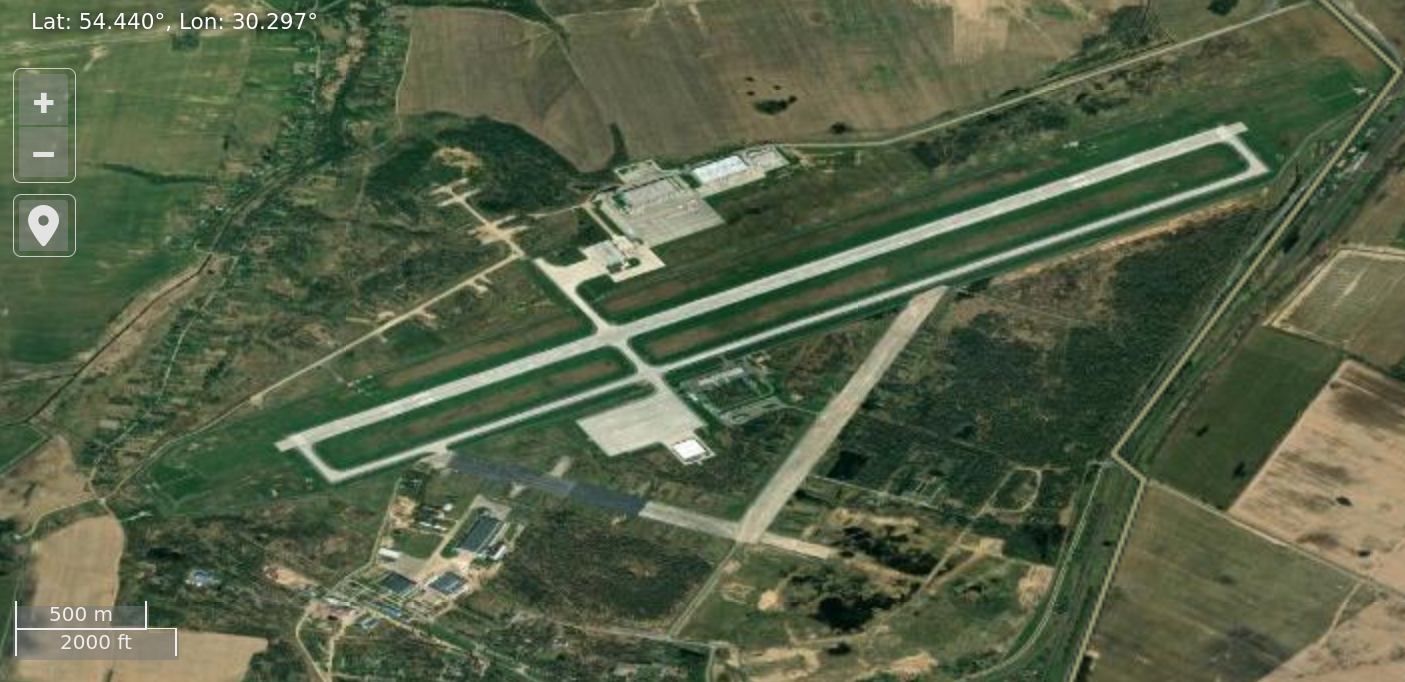
- Satellite imagery of Orsha Airport
- IATA: TXC; ICAO: UMIO

Summary
- Airport type: Military/Commercial
- Serves: Orsha
- Location: Orsha, Vitebsk Region, Belarus
- Elevation AMSL: 620 ft / 189 m
- Coordinates: 54°26′24″N 30°17′48″E

Map
- Location in Belarus Orsha Airport; Orša-Balbasava (Europe)

Runways
Direction	Length		Surface
Direction	ft	m	Surface
05/23	9,845	3,001	Concrete

Orsha Airport (previously named Balbasovo Airbase, given as Balbasava, Bolbasovo, Orsha Southwest, and Orsha) is a commercial airport in Belarus, located 11 km southwest of Orsha. It has a long runway, large tarmac area, a terminal building, 3 commercial remote stands, and 30 large revetments. A remote revetment area contains 5 bomber pads and probably 5 fighter pads.

The airport is also home to the Orsha Aircraft Repair Plant (OARP).

It was home to the 402nd Heavy Bomber Aviation Regiment (402 TBAP) flying Tupolev Tu-22M3 (ASCC: Backfire) aircraft as recently as 1993. The 402 TBAP was part of the 326th Heavy Bomber Aviation Division at Soltsy-2.

Its IATA code TXC was assigned in late 2021, in preparation of taking up commercial air transport operations.
