= 326th Heavy Bomber Aviation Division =

Russian Long Range Aviation formation

326th Night Bomber Aviation Division (1943–1944) 326th Bomber Aviation Division (1944–1951) 326th Heavy Bomber Aviation Division (1951–present)
- Active: 1943–present
- Country: Soviet Union (1943–1991); Russia (1992–present)
- Branch: Soviet Air Force (1943–1991); Russian Air Force (1992–2015); Russian Aerospace Forces (2015–present)
- Type: Bomber Aviation division
- Role: Strategic bombing
- Garrison/HQ: Ukrainka
- Engagements: World War II; Battle of Korsun-Cherkassy; Dnieper-Carpathian Offensive; Vistula-Oder Offensive; Battle of Königsberg; Berlin Offensive; Invasion of Manchuria
- Decorations: Order of Kutuzov, 2nd class
- Battle honours: Tarnopol

326th Tarnopolsky Order of Kutuzov Heavy Bomber Air Division (326 TBAD) is an Aviation Division of the Long Range Aviation of Russia. It was previously part of the 37th Air Army of the Supreme High Command. It was originally formed as the 326th Night Bomber Aviation Division, formed at Yegoryevsk in Moscow Oblast on 10 October 1943. On 23 June 1944, it was renamed the 326th Bomber Aviation Division.

== History ==
In 1945, it had three regiments of Tupolev Tu-2 bombers. 12th Heavy Bomber Aviation Regiment was briefly part of the division in 1959–60 at Ostrov, Pskov Oblast, while flying Tu-16s.

Components in 1990 according to Michael Holm:

- Division Headquarters, Tartu
  - 132nd Heavy Bomber Aviation Regiment (Raadi Airfield, Tartu, Estonian SSSR) with Tu-22M3 and Tu-16K
  - 402nd Heavy Bomber Aviation Regiment (Balbasovo, Vitebsk Oblast) with Tu-22M3 and Tu-16K
  - 840th Heavy Bomber Aviation Regiment (Soltsy-2, Novgorod Oblast) with Tu-22M3

Headquarters were located at:

- Raadi Airfield, Estonian SSR, December 1959–1992 [58 24 08N, 26 49 19E]
- Soltsy-2, Novgorod Oblast, 1992–1998 [58 08 16N, 30 19 47E]
- Ukrainka (air base), Amur Oblast, 1998–2009/2010 [50 32 21N, 79 11 38E]

From 1987 to 1991, Dzhokhar Dudayev, who later became president of the self-proclaimed Chechen Republic of Ichkeria, was the commander of the division.

The division's dispersal airfields included Ugolny Airport near Anadyr, Magadan Airport, and Tiksi.

== Composition ==
The command of the division was at the Ukrainka airbase in the Far East.

The composition of the division included:

- 182 Guards Red Berlin-Sevastopol Heavy Bomber Aviation Regiment (Tu-95MS planes) (Ukrainka)
- 79th Red Star Order Heavy Bomber Aviation Regiment (Tu-95MS aircraft) (Ukrainka)
- 200th Guards Heavy Bomber Aviation Regiment Brest Red (Tu-22M3 planes) (Belaya)
- 444th Berlin Order of Kutuzov III, and Alexander Nevsky Heavy Bomber Aviation Regiment (Tu-22M3 aircraft) (Vozdvizhenka (air base))

In 2007–2009, the 444th Heavy Bomber Aviation Regiment was disbanded.

As of 2020, the division was reported based at Ukrainka with one element reportedly operating Tu-22M3 bombers from the Belaya air base as part of Russian Long Range Aviation.
