= Pavel Androsov =

Soviet and Russian military officer (1954–2025)

- Павел Васильевич Андросов
- Born: 6 September 1954; Tambov Oblast, Russian SFSR, Soviet Union
- Died: 8 March 2025 (aged 70); Moscow, Russia
- Burial place: Federal Military Memorial Cemetery
- Military career
- Allegiance: USSR; Russia
- Branch: Soviet Air Forces; Russian Air Force
- Service years: 1971–2009
- Rank: Major General
- Commands: 37th Air Army
- Awards: Order of the Red Star; Merited Military Pilot of the Russian Federation

Pavel Vasilyevich Androsov (Russian: Павел Васильевич Андросов; 6 September 1954 – 8 March 2025) was an officer of the Soviet and later Russian Air Force. He rose to the rank of Major General and served as commander of the 37th Air Army between 2007 and 2009.

== Biography ==
Androsov was born on 6 September 1954 in Tambov Oblast, in what was then the Russian Soviet Socialist Federative Republic, in the Soviet Union. He graduated from the Tambov Higher Military Aviation School of Pilots in 1975 and went on to serve in Long-Range Aviation units. He carried out further education and training at the Gagarin Air Force Academy, graduating in 1988, and the Military Academy of the General Staff, graduating in 2000.

Androsov rose through ranks and positions, being appointed to command a squadron, then as deputy commander of the 185th Guards Heavy Bomber Aviation Regiment, based at Poltava, in the Ukrainian SSR. In this role he participated in combat operations in Afghanistan during the Soviet-Afghan War. He was the commander of a heavy bomber aviation regiment in the Kiev Military District, and then commander of the 55th Heavy Bomber Aviation Division based at Vozdvizhenka, Primorsky Krai, and then head of the flight safety service of the 37th Air Army.

In November 2002, Androsov became chief of staff and first deputy commander of the 37th Air Army, and on 15 May 2007 was appointed its commander, with the rank of major general. He held the position until his retirement in August 2009, when the 37th Air Army was reformed as Long-Range Aviation Command.

Androsov suffered a heart attack at his office at the Tupolev design bureau on 7 March 2025, and died the following day. He was 70. He was buried at the Federal Military Memorial Cemetery on 12 March.

== Awards and honours ==
Over his career Androsov was trained to fly all types of aircraft assigned to the Long-Range Aviation branch, logging more than three thousand flight hours. He was awarded the Order of the Red Star, various medals, and the title of Honoured Military Pilot of the Russian Federation.
