= Engels-2 air base =

Military airbase in Russia

Engels-2
- Энгельс-2
- Engels, Saratov Oblast in Russia
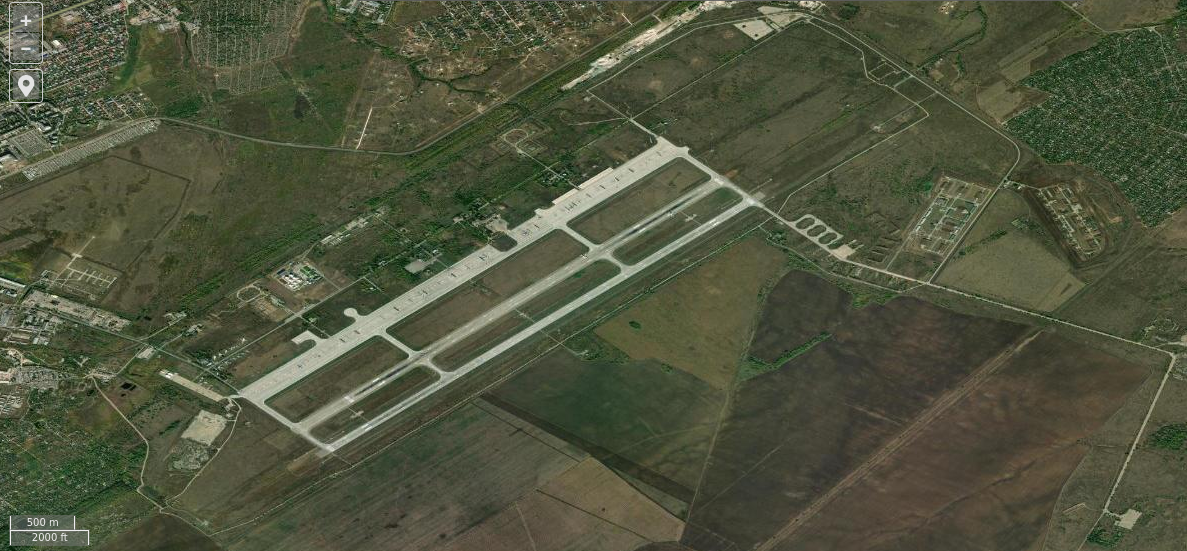
- Satellite imagery of Engels-2 air base

Site information
- Type: Air base
- Owner: Ministry of Defence
- Operator: Russian Aerospace Forces
- Controlled by: Long-Range Aviation
- Condition: Operational

Location
- Location of Engels-2 Engels-2 (Russia)
- Coordinates: 51°28′52″N 46°12′38″E

Site history
- Built: 1952
- Built by: Soviet Armed Forces
- In use: 1954–present
- Battles/wars: Russian invasion of Ukraine

Garrison information
- Garrison: 184th Heavy Bomber Aviation Regiment; 121st Guards Heavy Bomber Aviation Regiment

Airfield information
- Identifiers: IATA: none, ICAO: XWSG
- Elevation: 37 metres (121 ft) AMSL
Runways
Direction	Length and surface
04/22	3,500 metres (11,483 ft) Concrete
04R/22L	3,500 metres (11,483 ft) Concrete

Engels-2 (Russian: Энгельс) is a strategic bomber military airbase in Russia located 14 kilometres (8.7 mi) east of Saratov. Engels is a major bomber operations base, and is Russia's sole operating location for the Tupolev Tu-160 (NATO: Blackjack) strategic bomber. The base has a 3,500-metre (11,500 ft) runway and about 10 large revetments. It is named after the nearby city of Engels itself named after communist philosopher Friedrich Engels.

As of 2022, the base was home to the 121st Guards Heavy Bomber Aviation Regiment with the Tu-160M and 184th Heavy Bomber Aviation Regiment with the Tupolev Tu-95MS (NATO: Bear-H) of the 22nd Guards Heavy Bomber Aviation Division.

Aircraft from the 121st and 184th attacked Ukraine during the 2022 Russian invasion of Ukraine. Ukraine has launched multiple drone attacks on the airbase since December 2022.

== History ==
Engels air base, aerial view, 2015

In 1930, the construction of a military piloting school began 1.5 km from the town of Engels, in a vacant lot. The 14th School of Pilots was activated at Engels in December 1930. Around 10,000 people worked on the site. In February 1932, the first airplane, a Polikarpov U-2 used the site. The school was renamed the Engels School of Pilots.

By 1936, the Engels military aviation school was one of the best flight schools in the country. Students flew Polikarpov U-2, Polikarpov R-5 and CSS aircraft. Prior to the Second World War the school trained several thousand pilots. Many of them fought in the Spanish Civil War, participated in the Battles of Khalkhin Gol and the Soviet-Finnish War (1939–1940). For participation in the fighting, seven pupils were named Heroes of the Soviet Union.

At the beginning of the Second World War the school had in service Polikarpov U-2, ANT-40, Pe-2, and other aircraft. During the war years the Engels Flying School sent to the front 14 regiments. Among them were three women's regiments (including the Night Witches), in which served Major Marina Raskova. 190 pupils of the school were awarded the title of Hero of the Soviet Union for combat exploits.

In the early 1950s, the construction of the new "Engels-2" airport with a concrete runway with a length of 3 km and a width of 100m began. Therefore, by September 1954 the Engels school was moved to the city of Tambov. In December 1954, the 201st Heavy Bomber Aviation Division was established, comprising the 79th, 1096th and 1230th Heavy Bomber Aviation Regiments (TBAPs). The personnel of the regiments was assembled by choosing the best specialists of the Long Range Aviation, graduates of military schools and academies. In 1954, the Engels area was closed off from Western ground observation.

The first Myasishchev M-4 bombers arrived in Engels in February 1955. In May 1957, the first modernised 3M bomber arrived. In 1957, the 79th Heavy Bomber Aviation Regiment was transferred to Ukrainka and was transferred to the 73rd Heavy Bomber Aviation Division. Gradually the M-4 and 3M bombers were converted into aerial refuelling tankers. Air refueling significantly increased the range of the bombers, which expanded their capacity. Around 1960, the 1230th Heavy Bomber Aviation Regiment was renamed the 1230th Aviation Regiment Air Refueling.

The 3M bombers were part of Long Range Aviation until 1985, and then were destroyed in accordance with the agreement on the reduction of offensive weapons. The 3MS-II and 3MN-II, converted into tankers, were in service for much longer – up to the end of 1993 and before being replaced by the more advanced Il-78.

Engels was home to the Tupolev Tu-95MS Bear-H cruise missile carrying variant beginning in 1979. Engels Bear-Hs were active throughout the 1980s, practicing their wartime tasking of cruise missile launches with flights around the North Pole north of Alaska and Canada, and in the North Atlantic. The base was to have received the first production Tu-160 in 1987, but it went to Priluki, whose units had Tupolev Tu-22M experience. The first three Tu-160s not at Pryluky were incorporated into the 1096th Heavy Bomber Aviation Regiment in 1992. By 1994 Engels had five Tu-160 bombers in operation. That same year the 1096th Heavy Bomber Aviation Regiment was redesignated the 121st Heavy Bomber Aviation Regiment, adopting its colours and traditions. In 1998 the START I treaty exchange of information showed it had 20 operational Tu-95 bombers and six Tu-160 bombers, all with cruise missile capability.

From 1999 to 2001 the base received eight Tu-160s from Ukraine paid for by gas price reductions. The last two arrived in February 2001. The 184th Guards Heavy Bomber Aviation Regiment was reformed at the base in September 2000, drawing on Tu-95MS aircraft transferred from Mozdok. By 2007 the base had 14 Tu-160s, 20 Tu-95s and an unknown number of Tu-22Ms.

Construction of a new runway parallel to the existing one was completed in 2015 in conjunction with a supporting network of taxiways, communications, electrical and meteorological systems. The new runway will be able to handle all Russian Aerospace Forces aircraft.

=== 2022 Russian invasion of Ukraine ===
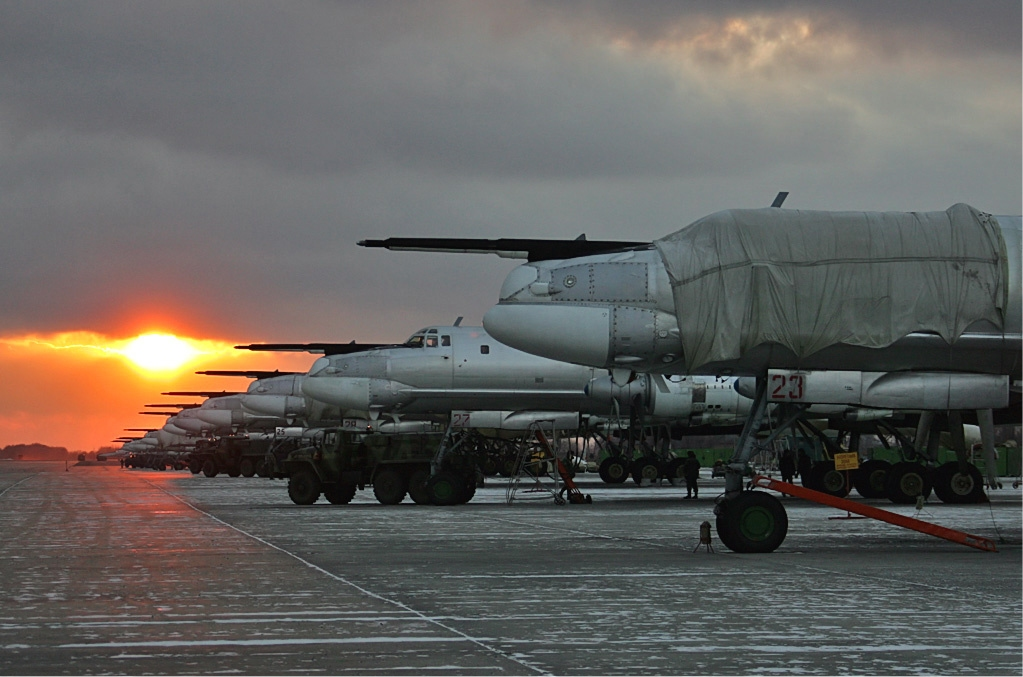
A line-up of Tupolev Tu-95MS aircraft during sunset at Engels Air Force Base, Russia, 2005

On 5 December 2022, during the 2022 Russian invasion of Ukraine, an explosion caused by a Ukrainian drone attack reportedly damaged two Tu-95s. According to Russian Ministry of Defence, Ukraine attempted to strike Russia's long-range aviation bombers stationed at the base with Soviet-made jet drones. Russia claims the drones were intercepted by air defence systems at low altitude. Satellite images revealed after the attack show at least one Tu-95MS bomber damaged. The Dyagilevo Air Base was also raided on the same night.

On 26 December 2022, at midnight, explosions were again reported at the air base. Air sirens were reported being heard at the base and surrounding areas. The local governor Roman Busargin reported no damage to "civilian infrastructure". At least two explosions were heard. These explosions have been reported by both the Ukrainian and Russian media. Three people from the “technical staff” were reportedly been killed. According to Russian television, "A Ukrainian unmanned aerial vehicle was shot down at low altitude while approaching the Engels military airfield in the Saratov region," Ukrainian and Russian social media accounts report a number of bombers were destroyed. However Reuters could not confirm these claims.

On 29 December, Busargin claimed that a Ukrainian drone was shot near the airbase with only slight damage to residential housing and no injuries. Reports on social confirm air raid sirens and explosions.

In August 2023 satellite images showed Russia placing tyres on top of planes at the base. Schuyler Moore from U.S. Central Command later said this was probably an attempt to fool image recognition algorithms on systems that might be used to attack the base.

On 3 February 2024, Oleg Stegachev, a Tu-95 crew commander at Engels air base, was shot. Ukrainian intelligence was blamed, whether he survived or not is unknown.

On 5 April 2024, Ukraine launched 53 drones into western Russia, a number attacked the base. Russian sources claim that all drones and attacks were thwarted.

On 10 December 2024, local governor Busargin stated on Telegram that Ukrainian drones attacked the airfield during early morning.

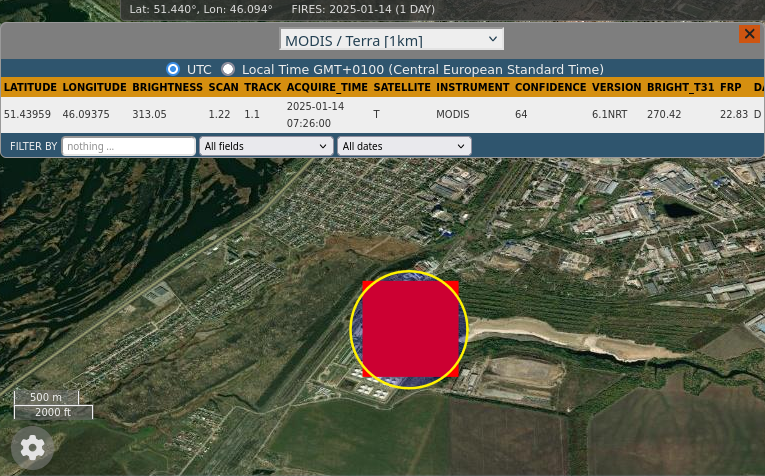
NASA's FIRMS detected fire at an Engels fuel depot on 14 January 2025 07:26:00 (UTC)

On 8 January 2025 Ukraine’s General Staff announced they hit a fuel storage facility supplying the Engels air base; governor of the Saratov region Roman Busargin merely confirmed that an unspecified industrial plant in Engels had sustained damage from falling drone debris. On 14 January, the fuel storage facility was struck again, causing a fire detected by NASA's FIRMS.

On 11 February 2025, Ukrainian drones struck Saratov Oblast, explosions were reported around the perimeter of Engels-2 air base.

On the night of 19–20 March 2025, Ukrainian drones attacked the airbase, reportedly hitting fuel depots and weapons storage. Massive explosions were seen in the airbase. Local governor Busargin confirmed that a fire started in the airbase, and that 30 houses in the airbase were damaged during the drone attack. Secondary explosions continued through the day. The General Staff of the Ukrainian military claimed responsibility for the drone attack as a joint operation with the Ukrainian Security Services and Special Operations Forces. Russia claimed that it downed 132 drones launched by Ukraine. 50 drones were reportedly used, targeting ammunition storage at the air base. Satellite images showed several large craters. Reports were 3 service personnel were wounded, while 2 were reportedly killed. Some 120 civilians were evacuated and some 180 private homes were damaged due to the shockwave from the explosion. Clinical Hospital No. 1 in Engels was damaged by falling debris. Five civilians were reported injured.

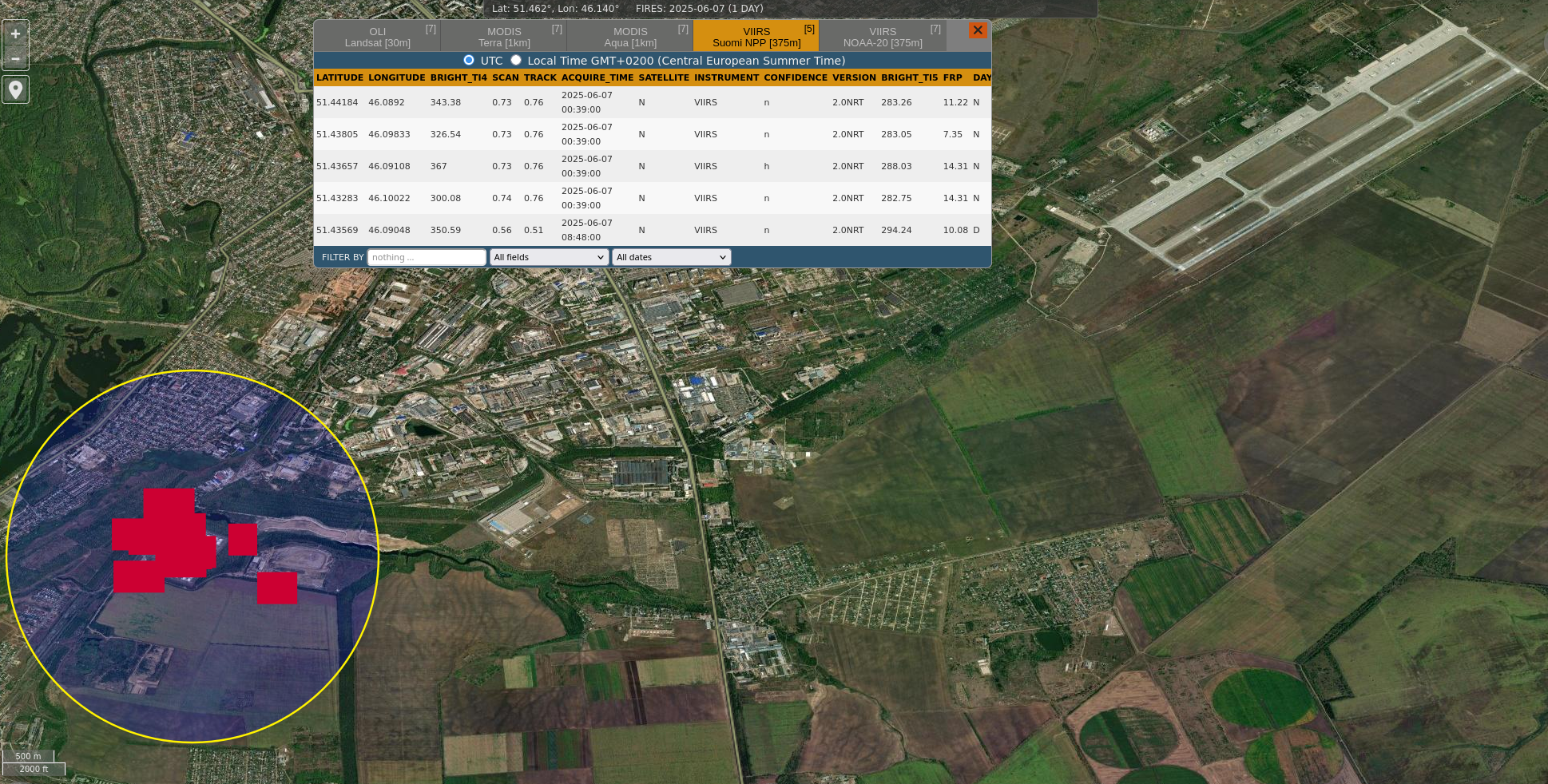
NASA's FIRMS detected fire at an Engels fuel depot on 7 June 2025 08:48:00 (UTC)

On 6 June 2025 the air base's fuel depot known as 'Kristall oil depot' was again struck by Ukrainian drones causing fires in four tanks in two different sections of the depot. Also the following day the fires were detected by NASA's FIRMS.

On 28 November 2025, Ukraine claimed to have struck air base with drones, locals reported hearing explosions in vicinity of the air base.

As of June 2026 Russian forces are constructing hardened aircraft shelters for the bombers based there.

== Aircraft ==
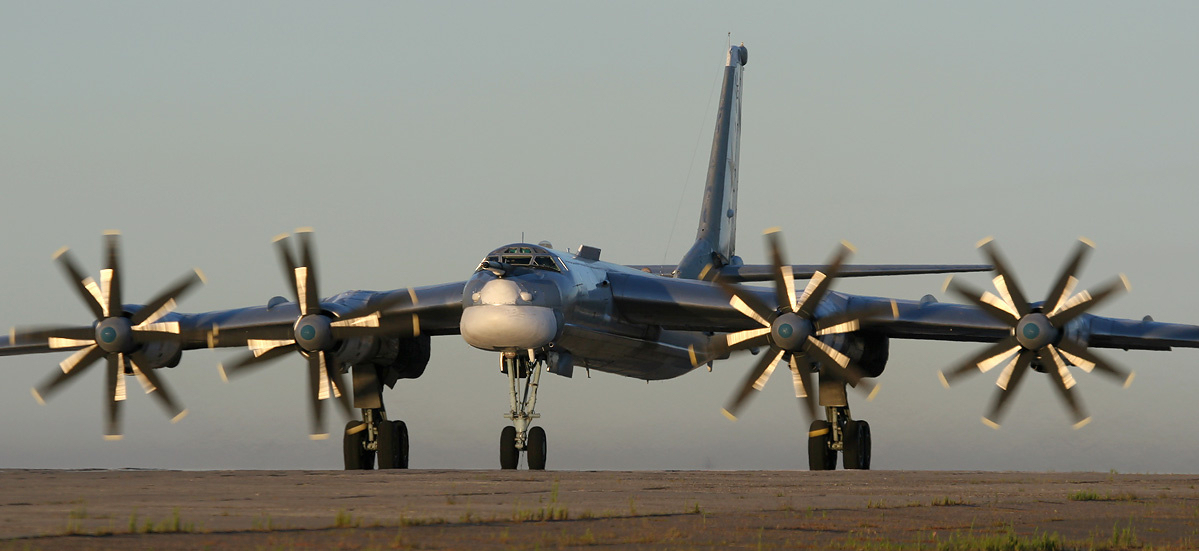
Russian Tupolev Tu-95MS (28 RED) at Engels Air Force Base, Russia

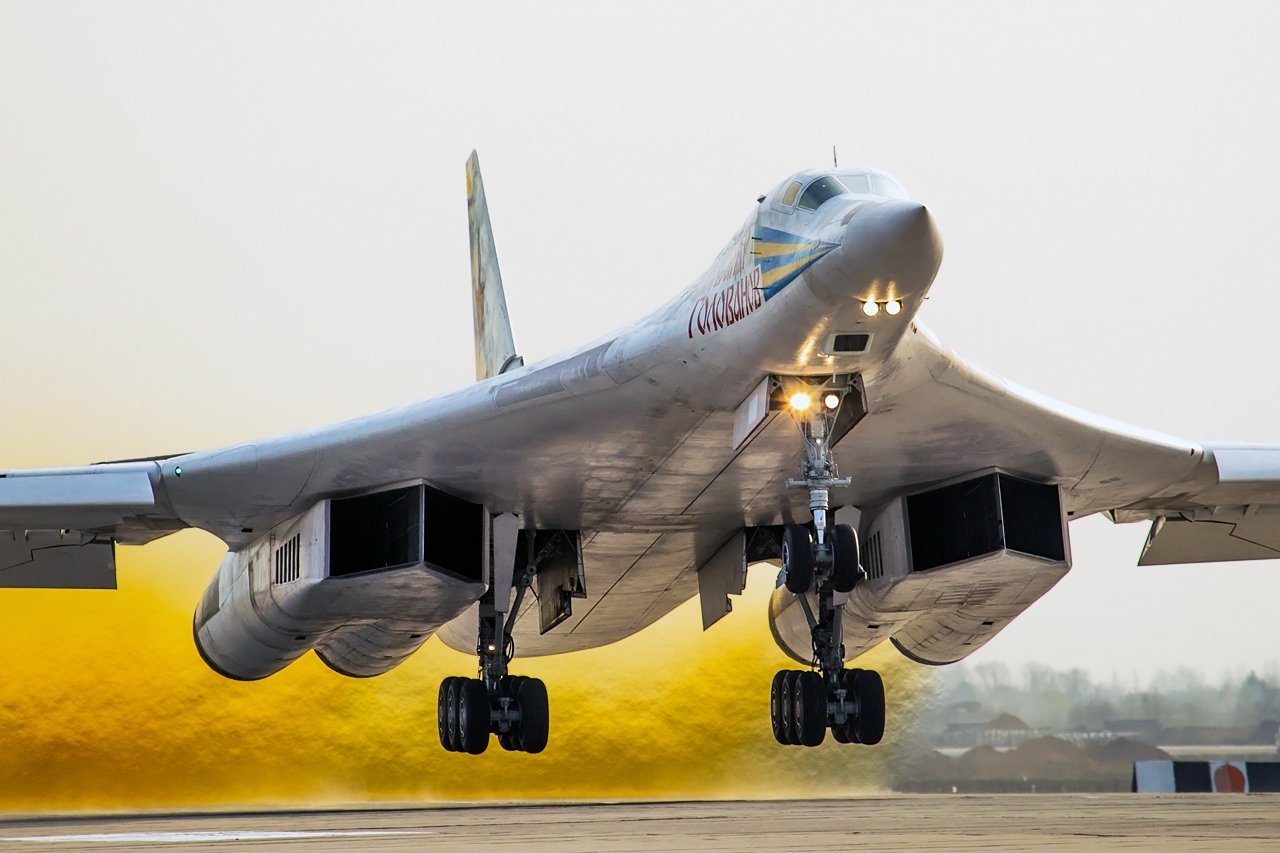
Tupolev Tu-160 in the 121st Guards Heavy Bomber Aviation Regiment at Engels airbase

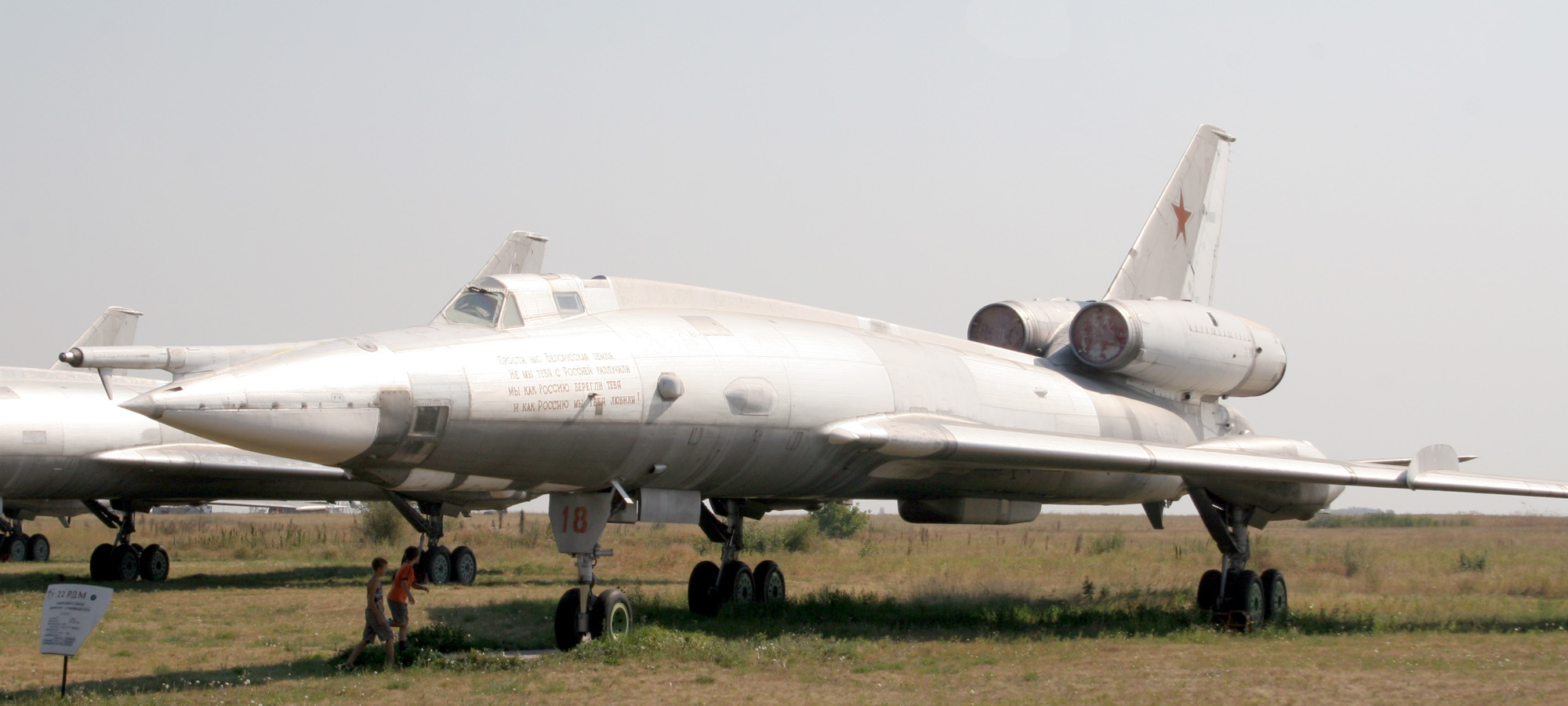
Tu-22RDM aircraft, tail number 18, exhibited at the Museum of Long-Range Aviation at Engels Air Base

As of 2007, the base had:

- 14 Tu-160s (121st Guards Heavy Bomber Aviation Regiment)
- 20 Tu-95s (184th Heavy Bomber Aviation Regiment)
- Unknown number of Tu-22M-3s (6950th Aviation Base)
- 1 Ilyushin Il-62

The 22nd Guards Heavy Bomber Aviation Division of the 37th Air Army controlled operations at the base up until the Air Force reorganisation of 2009–10. In 2015/16, the division was reformed within the Russian Aerospace Force's Long-Range Aviation branch and based at Engels.

== Museum ==
The museum at Engels-2 displays:

- airplanes: Ilyushin Il-62, Myasishchev M-4-3MS-2, Antonov An-2, Antonov An-12, Antonov An-24, Tupolev Tu-95, Tupolev Tu-22, Tupolev Tu-134, Aero L-29 Delfín, Aero L-39 Albatros, Tupolev Tu-22M3;
- cruise missiles: Kh-55, Kh-22НА, Kh-20М, KSR-2UD;
- bombs: FAB-9000 M, FAB-5000 M, FAB-3000 M, FAB-1500 M, FAB-500 M, FAB-250 M, FAB-250 TS, SAB-250 T, OFAB-250, NOSAB-100TK, DOSAB-100 TC;
- historically valuable items: attributes of the Long-Range Aviation of Russia, commemorative photographs, fragments of rare aircraft.

As a consequence of the role of the base in Russia's war against Ukraine and the damage it has sustained, the museum had to close without any scheduled date to re-open.

== See also ==
- List of military airbases in Russia

== Bibliography ==
- Healey, John K. (January–February 2004). "Retired Warriors: 'Cold War' Bomber Legacy". Air Enthusiast. No. 109. pp. 75–79. ISSN 0143-5450.

== External links / further reading ==
- GlobalSecurity.org, Engel's, accessed December 2012.
- "Report on Bomber Elimination at Engels AFB", FBIS Daily Report FBIS-SOV-95-136, 5 July 1995
