= Soltsy-2 (air base) =

Military airport in Novgorod Oblast, Russia

Soltsy-2 Сольцы
- Soltsy, Novgorod Oblast in Russia
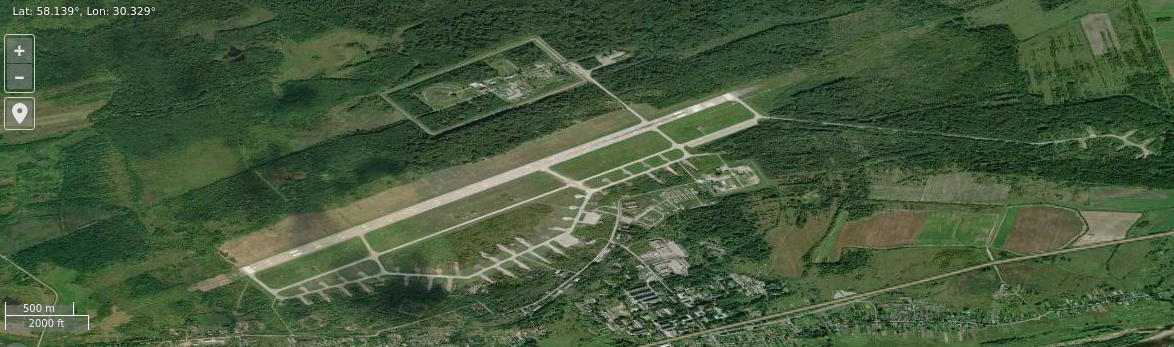
- Satellite imagery of Soltsy-2 air base

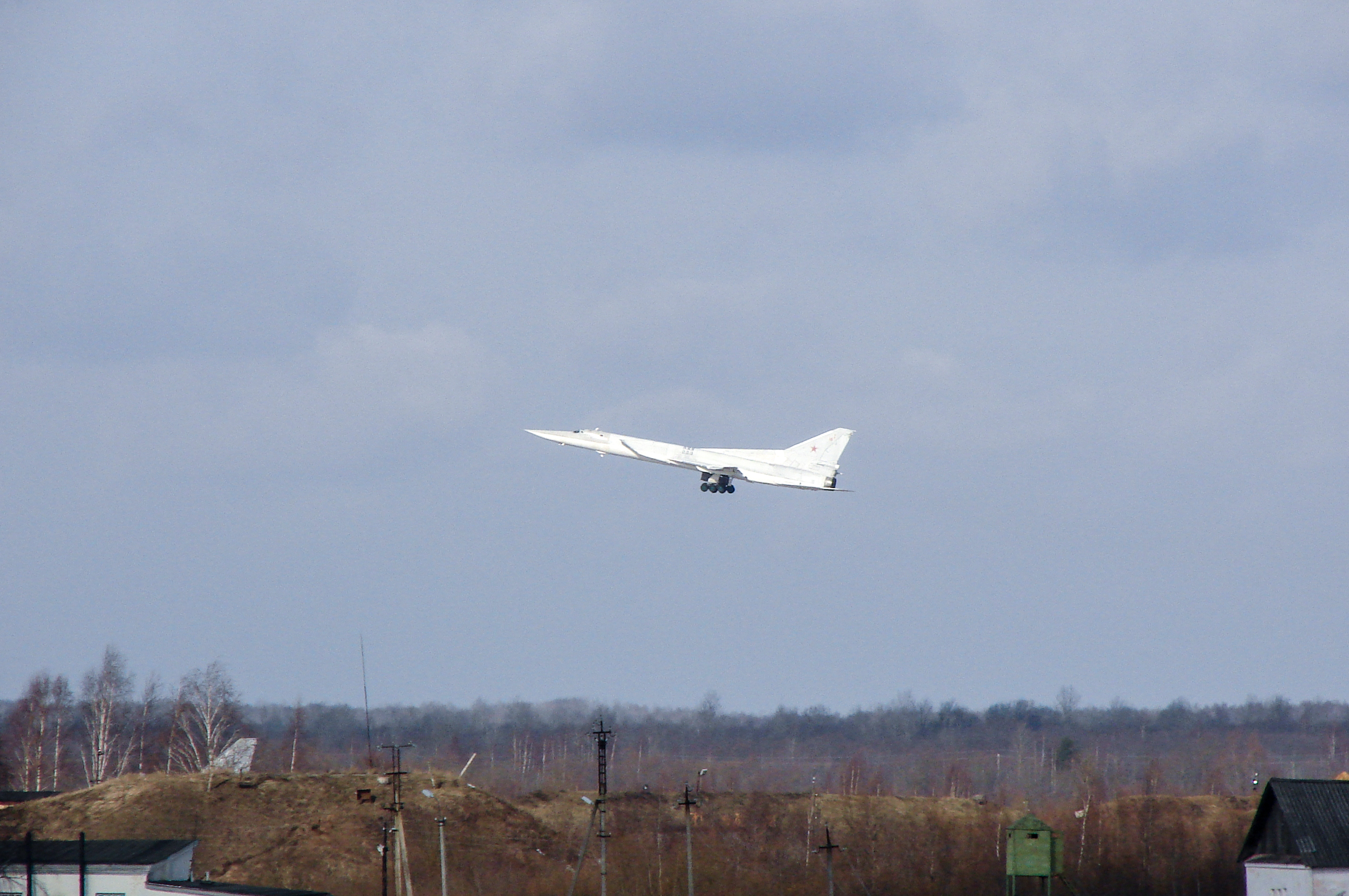
- Tu-22M3 of the Russian Air Force at Soltsy in 2007

Site information
- Type: Air Base
- Owner: Ministry of Defence
- Operator: Russian Aerospace Forces
- Controlled by: Long-Range Aviation

Location
- Shown within Novgorod Oblast Soltsy-2 (European Russia) Soltsy-2 (Russia)
- Coordinates: 58°8′20″N 30°19′45″E

Site history
- Built: 1951
- In use: 1951 - present

Airfield information
- Identifiers: ICAO: XLLL
- Elevation: 81 metres (266 ft) AMSL
Runways
Direction	Length and surface
05/23	3,000 metres (9,843 ft) Concrete

Soltsy-2 (Note: also spelled Sol'tsy, Soltsy, Solcy, Solcy 2) (Russian: Сольцы; ICAO: XLLL) is an air base in Novgorod Oblast, Russia located 2 km north of Soltsy and 72 km southwest of Novgorod. It contains large aircraft revetments, with a separate compound of 9 hardened areas about 1 mile from the airfield.

The base is home to the 40th Composite Aviation Regiment which flies the Tu-22M as part of the 22nd Guards Heavy Bomber Aviation Division.

In 1992, the headquarters of the 326th Heavy Bomber Aviation Division (326 TBAD) arrived from Tartu Raadi Airfield in newly independent Estonia. In 1998 the division headquarters was moved to Ukrainka in the Far East.

The 840th Heavy Bomber Aviation Regiment (840 TBAP) flew Tupolev Tu-22 aircraft from November 1951 through to 2010. The regiment was disbanded in 2010 following the changes initiated by the Russian military reforms from 2008.

Airfield is properly maintained for occasional training of Russian Aerospace Forces and to service governmental flights in Novgorod region.

Natural Resources Defense Council lists Soltsy-2 as a nuclear weapons facility.

== 2023 drone attack ==
On 19 August 2023 at about 10:00 am local time, the airbase was attacked by drones, which Russia claimed to be launched from Ukraine, 620 km away. A Tupolev Tu-22M long-range bomber, was reported damaged. Satellite pictures taken on 10 August showed Tu-22M3 dispersed in revetments either side of the runway. Pictures taken on 19 August showed all aircraft had been evacuated and the burnt out remains of one Tu-22M3.

== See also ==
- List of military airbases in Russia
