= First Contact Osa =

Ukrainian unmanned aerial vehicle

Osa
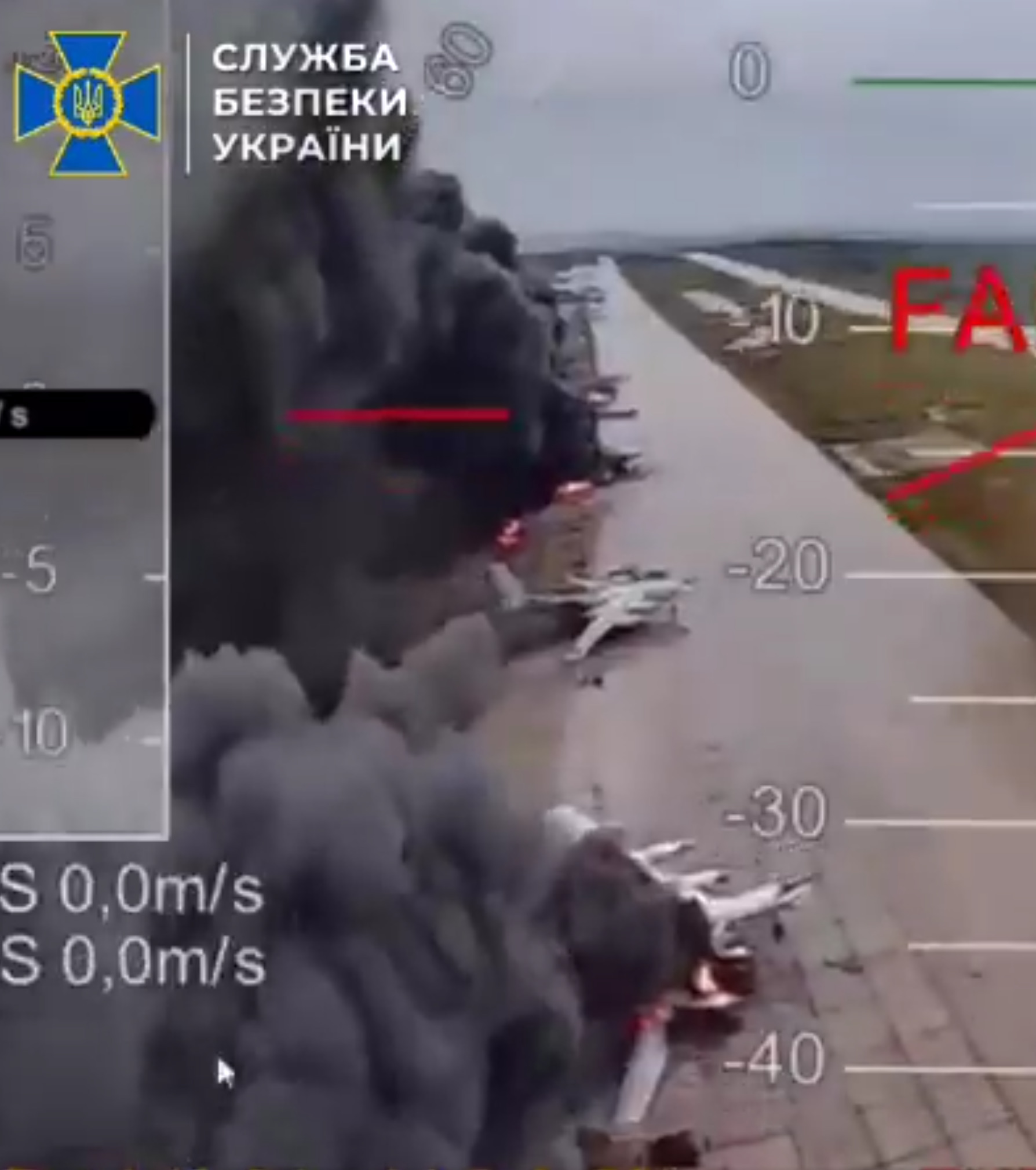
- Tu-95s during Operation Spider's Web

General information
- Type: Quadcopter
- Status: In service
- Primary user: Ukraine

Osa (Ukrainian for "wasp") is an unmanned aerial vehicle (UAV) quadcopter manufactured by First Contact, a Ukrainian company. Osa drones were notably used in Ukraine's Operation Spider's Web during the Russo-Ukrainian War.

== Specifications ==
Of particularly robust build and with an air-time of up to fifteen minutes, Osa drones are capable of carrying a payload of 3.3 kg (7.3 lb) and can accelerate up to 42 m/s (138 ft/s, or nearly 95 mph).

== See also ==
- Unmanned Systems Forces
