= Ukrainka (air base) =

Military airport in Amur Oblast, Russia

Ukrainka Ukrainka/Seryshevo
- Украинка/Серышево
- Belogorsk, Amur Oblast in Russia
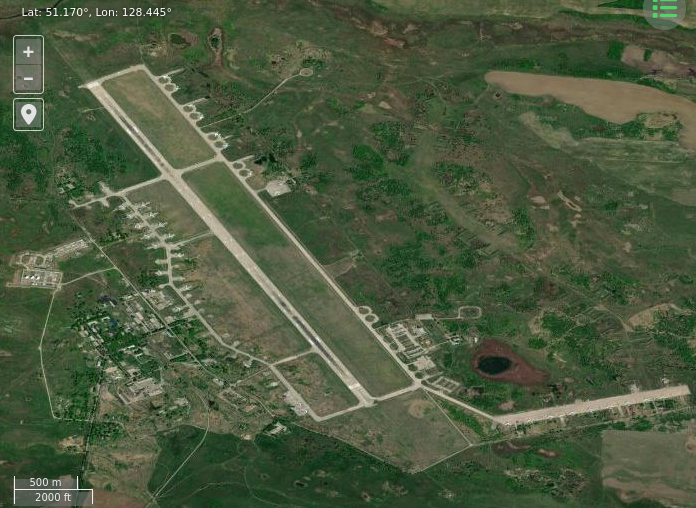
- Satellite imagery of Ukrainka air base

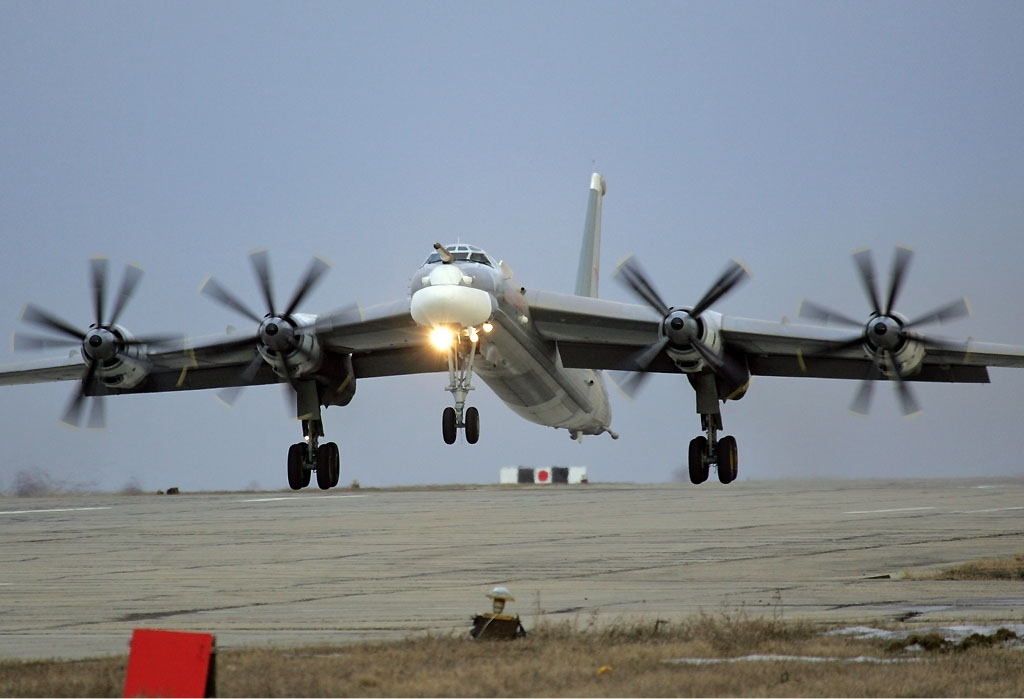

Site information
- Type: Air base
- Owner: Ministry of Defence
- Operator: Russian Aerospace Forces
- Controlled by: Long-Range Aviation

Location
- Shown within Amur Oblast Ukrainka (Russia)
- Coordinates: 51°10′12″N 128°26′42″E

Site history
- Built: 1955
- In use: 1955–present

Airfield information
- Identifiers: ICAO: UHBU, LID: ЬХБУ
- Elevation: 235 metres (771 ft) AMSL
Runways
Direction	Length and surface
03/21	3,500 metres (11,483 ft) Concrete

Ukrainka (Russian: Украинка; also known as Ookrainka and Seryshevo) is one of Russia's largest strategic Long Range Aviation bases in the Russian Far East. Located in Ukrainka, Amur Oblast, Russia, 28 km north of Belogorsk, and 8 km north of the town of Seryshevo, it is a major nuclear bomber base, with large tarmacs and nearly 40 revetments.

The base is home to the 79th Heavy Bomber Aviation Regiment and the 182nd Guards Heavy Bomber Aviation Regiment both of the 326th Heavy Bomber Aviation Division.

== History ==
In 1955, Ukrainka was one of only six Soviet bases capable of handling the Myasishchev M-4 (NATO: Bison) bomber. The Tupolev Tu-22 (NATO: Blinder) operated from the base in the 1960s-1970s, and by the 1980s, its fleet consisted of a large number of Tupolev Tu-95K22 (NATO: Bear-G) and a smaller number of Tu-95K (NATO: Bear-B) aircraft. By 1994, all of the early Tu-95 variants had been replaced by the Tu-95MS (NATO: Bear-H). In 1998, it had 16 Tu-95MS16 and 27 Tu-95MS6 aircraft, according to START I treaty documents.

Units stationed at Ukrainka have included:

- 73rd Heavy Bomber Aviation Regiment (73 TBAP), with 42 Tu-95 bombers in the mid-1990s, many from Dolon.
- 40 Gv TBAP (40th Guards Heavy Bomber Aviation Regiment) with Myasishchev 3M bombers starting in 1957, and Tu-95, Tupolev Tu-134, and Antonov An-26 aircraft through the 1980s and 1990s.

Tu-95 bombers that made up the 1023rd and 1226th TBAPs at Dolon in the Kazakh SSR were withdrawn to Ukrainka after the USSR dissolved in 1992.

In 2007, units stationed at the base included:

- 326th Heavy Bomber Aviation Division (326 TBAD) headquarters, which arrived from Soltsy-2 in the Leningrad Military District in 1998, and was probably disbanded in 2009–2010. Under control of 37th Air Army from October 1994. The division remained a core element at Ukrainka in 2020 with one regiment (flying Tupolev Tu-22M Backfire) also deployed at the Belaya air base.
- 79th Guards Heavy Bomber Aviation Regiment (79 Gv TBAP), with Myasishchev 3M bombers starting in 1957, and Tu-95s through the 1980s and 1990s.
- 182nd Heavy Bomber Aviation Regiment (182 TBAP), flying Tu-95MS aircraft as recently as 2006.

The other two regiments listed under the control of the 326th TBAD by AirForces Monthly in 2007 were the 200th Heavy Bomber Air Regiment at Belaya, near Irkutsk, and the 444th Heavy Bomber Air Regiment at Vozdvizhenka (Ussuriysk).

In 2009 there were extensive Air Force reductions. Strategic bomber units were reduced to three, with Ukrainka becoming the home of the 6952nd Air Base (warfare.ru reporting that it was the former 79th Heavy Bomber Aviation Regiment).

On June 1, 2025, as part of Operation Spider's Web, an attack on this air base was prevented as the truck carrying FPV drones exploded.

== See also ==
- List of military airbases in Russia
