= Olenya airbase =

Russian Navy reconnaissance base in Murmansk Oblast, Russia

Olenya Olenegorsk/Vysokiy
- Оленегорск/Высокий
- Olenegorsk, Murmansk Oblast in Russia
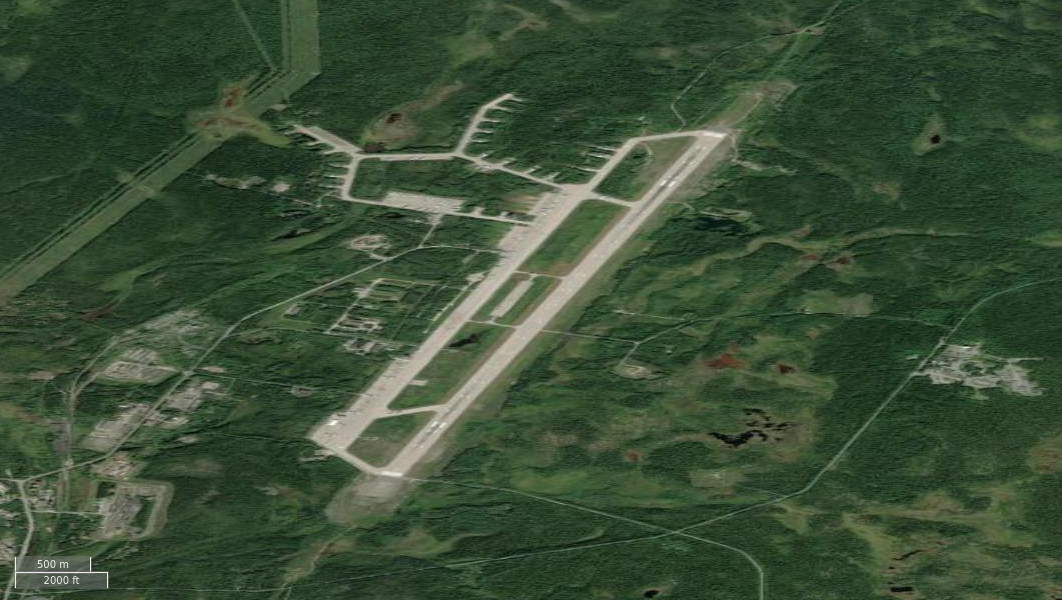
- Satellite imagery of Olenya air base

Site information
- Type: Air Base
- Owner: Ministry of Defence
- Operator: Russian Aerospace Forces
- Controlled by: Long-Range Aviation

Location
- Shown within Murmansk Oblast Olenya (Russia)
- Coordinates: 68°09′06″N 33°27′54″E

Site history
- In use: 1957 - present

Airfield information
- Identifiers: ICAO: XLMO
- Elevation: 214 metres (702 ft) AMSL
Runways
Direction	Length and surface
18/36	3,500 metres (11,483 ft) Concrete

Olenya (also Olenegorsk) is a major Russian Navy reconnaissance base, located on the Kola Peninsula 92 km south of Murmansk. As of 2020, units at the base were subordinate to the Long-Range Aviation branch of the Russian Aerospace Forces. The base and its staff settlement (Vysoky, Murmansk Oblast), across Lake Permusozero from the city of Olenegorsk, are served by the Olenegorsk rail station (formerly Olenya station). Olenya has served as the headquarters for five MRAD (Naval Reconnaissance Air Division), and has hosted two reconnaissance regiments. Its 3500-meter runway is the longest on the Kola Peninsula, making it a key facility for intercontinental flights across the North Atlantic basin.

The base is home to the 40th Composite Aviation Regiment as part of the 22nd Guards Heavy Bomber Aviation Division.

== History ==
Olenya was first detected by US intelligence in 1957, and was listed as having a runway length of 3350 m (11,000 ft). The base served as a forward deployment field for Long Range Aviation and was one of nine Arctic staging facilities for nuclear strikes on the United States. An analysis in 1966 revealed 21 Tupolev Tu-16 Badger aircraft. Near the airfield is the Olenegorsk Radar Station ballistic missile early warning site, which entered service in 1971. A number of surface-to-air missile sites were operational near Olenya during the Cold War. During the 1960s and 1970s, Olenya was used as a refueling stop on the Moscow to Havana Tupolev Tu-114 route.

As of 2006, Google Earth imagery showed nearly 40 Tupolev Tu-22M bombers on the airfield, but by 2018 only four of the aircraft appeared serviceable with another 27 aircraft awaiting disposal.

On 7 October 2022, satellite photos showed 7 Tu-160 and 4 Tu-95 at the air base.

== Stationed units ==
Units stationed at the airfield during the Cold War included:

- 924th Naval Reconnaissance Aviation Regiment (924 MRAP), operating Tupolev Tu-22M aircraft.
- 88th Separate Fighter-Bomber Aviation Regiment (88 OMAPIB), operating Mikoyan MiG-27 aircraft, disbanded August 1995.
- Operational Group Arctic (OGA), maintaining standby facilities for Tupolev Tu-95 bomber aircraft.

In 2020, the Tu-22M3-based unit may now be the 40th Mixed Aviation Regiment operating in both a maritime-attack and land-strike role.

== Notable events ==
The Tu-95V aircraft carrying the Tsar Bomba, the most powerful nuclear weapon ever detonated, took off from the airbase on 30 October 1961.

After a training flight on 22 January 2019, a Tu-22M3 broke up upon making a hard landing in inclement weather at the airbase. Two of the four crew members died in the crash, and a third died on his way to the hospital.

According to TASS, the first test launch of the Kh-47M2 Kinzhal ("dagger", a nuclear-capable air-launched ballistic missile) in the Arctic took place mid-November 2019 from the airbase. Reportedly, the launch was carried out by a MiG-31K, where the missile hit a ground target at Pemboy proving ground, reaching a speed of Mach 10.

== Russo-Ukrainian War ==
In July 2024 Ukraine's Main Directorate of Intelligence claimed they attacked the base with a drone and hit a Tu-22M3 bomber. The attack is not confirmed by independent sources.

On 1 June 2025, as part of Operation Spider's Web, a swarm of Ukrainian short-range drones attacked the airbase, causing multiple explosions and fire. First-person videos published on various social media platforms, showing drones attacking various Tupolev long-range bombers. A similar attack targeted the Belaya, Ivanovo Severny, and Dyagilevo air bases at the same time.

The Tu-22M3 contingent at Olenya was reportedly reinforced in 2025 when bombers, likely from the Belaya air base in Siberia, were deployed to the region. Tu-95MS Bear bombers have reportedly also used Olenya in carrying out strikes in Ukraine.

== See also ==
- List of military airbases in Russia
- Olenya Bay which is located at 69°13′N 33°23′E and is 2 nautical miles (3.7 km; 2.3 mi) northwest of the Russian Shipyard Number 10 at Polyarny and was known as the "Olenya Guba Submarine Base, Olenya Bay, USSR" during the Soviet era
