= Chagan Air Base =

Military airport in Semey, Kazakhstan

- Semey, Abai Region in Kazakhstan
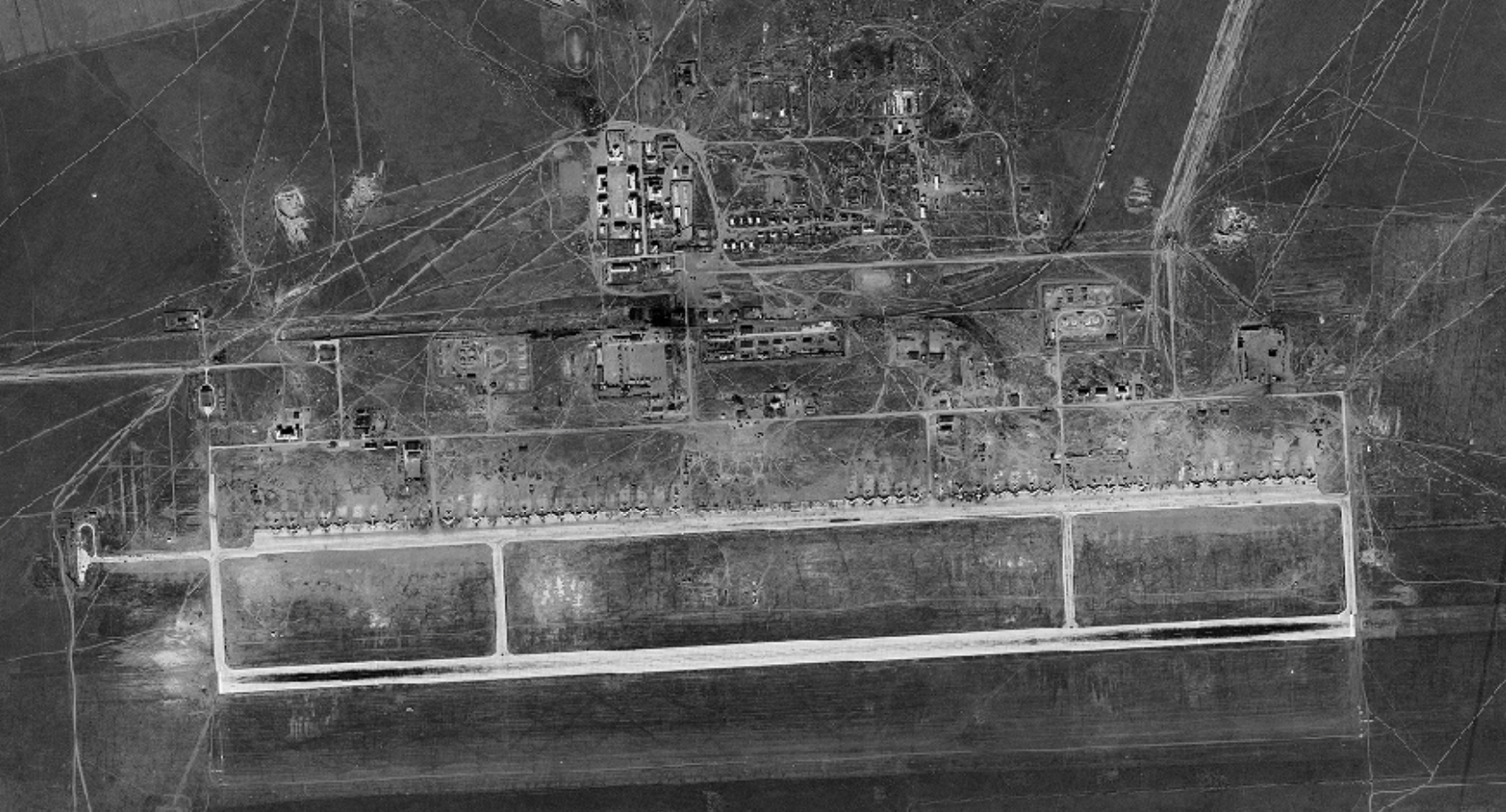
- Satellite imagery of Chagan Air Base captured by KH-7 Gambit on 4 October, 1965, showing many bombers parked along the apron.

Site information
- Type: Military airbase
- Condition: Abandoned

Location
- Location of Chagan Air Base in Kazakhstan
- Coordinates: 50°32′0″N 079°11′0″E

Site history
- Built: 1950s
- Battles/wars: Cold War

Airfield information
- Identifiers: ICAO: UASD
- Elevation: 215 metres (705 ft) AMSL
Runways
Direction	Length and surface
	4,025 metres (13,205 ft) Concrete

Chagan Air Base, also known as Dolon Air Base and Semipalatinsk-2, was an air base in Semipalatinsk (modern Semey), Kazakhstan, that served as a major Cold War bomber base under the 37th Air Army, Soviet Long Range Aviation.

== History ==
In 1955, Dolon was one of only six Soviet bases capable of handling the Myasishchev M-4 (Bison) bomber. The 79th Heavy Bomber Aviation Division was created at Dolon in 1957. The Tupolev Tu-160 (Blackjack) was temporarily deployed to Dolon in the late 1980s. In 1990, Dolon had 40 Tupolev Tu-95 (Bear) aircraft, which were eliminated by 1994, ending the base's strategic bomber role. It contains significant tarmac space and over 50 revetments. Until at least 1980 it served as one of three bases for the Soviet Union's Tupolev Tu-95 "Bear" long-range bomber fleet. The nearby Dolon Southwest, a former airfield 32 km to the south, was probably a dispersal field and no longer exists. The airbase was built in the 1950s and abandoned in the 1990s.

=== Units ===
Units based at Dolon included:

- 79th Heavy Bomber Aviation Division
- 1023rd Heavy Bomber Aviation Regiment (1023 TBAP) flying Tu-95 and Tu-95M aircraft (1957–62), Tu-95K (1960–83), and Tu-95MS aircraft (1983–92).
- 1226th Heavy Bomber Aviation Regiment (1226 TBAP) flying Tu-95 and Tu-95M aircraft (1957–62), Tu-95K and Tu-95MS aircraft (1984–92).

The 79th TBAD was under the control of Long Range Aviation from 1957 to 1960, the 8th independent Heavy Bomber Aviation Corps (later to become the 30th Air Army) from 1960 until 1980, and finally, the 37th Air Army from 1980 until 1992.

Both regiments were taken over by Kazakhstan in 1992 and the aircraft were withdrawn to the Russian Federation.
