= Russian Long Range Aviation =

Sub-branch of the Russian Air Forces

Russian Long Range Aviation (Russian: Авиация Дальнего Действия, romanized: Aviatsiya dal'nego deystviya, literally Aviation of Distant Action and abbreviated DA) is a sub-branch of the Russian Air Forces responsible for delivering long-range nuclear or conventional strikes by aircraft (rather than missiles). The Russian Long Range Aviation and now-dissolved Ukrainian Long Range Aviation were both previously part of the Soviet Air Forces, before it was split into the Air Forces of its many successor states, most notably the Russian Air Force and Ukrainian Air Force. Those branches were tasked with long-range bombardment of strategic targets with nuclear weapons.

== History ==
With the dissolution of the Soviet Union, Long-Range Aviation in Russia entered a period of decline, along with the other former components of the Soviet Armed Forces. This culminated when the command was formally disbanded in 1998 as part of the amalgamation of the Russian Air Defence Forces and the Russian Air Force. It became the 37th Air Army of the Supreme High Command.

In 2009 the 37th Air Army of the Supreme Command was disbanded as part of the 2008 Russian military reforms, reformed once more as the Long Range Aviation Command. As of 2020 the Long-Range Aviation Forces were being revitalized through both the modernization of aircraft as well as the incorporation of long-range supersonic and hypersonic cruise missiles. In 2020, a new stealth bomber, the Tupolev PAK DA, was reported to be in development. The design of the PAK DA was reported to have been "finalized" in 2021 with initial delivery of the first operational aircraft projected for 2027.

Since 2015-16, Russian Long-Range Aviation includes two frontline divisions:

- 22nd Guards Heavy Aviation Division (formerly 6950th Airbase in Engels deploying Tu-160 Blackjack heavy strategic bombers and Tu-95MSM/MS Bear strategic bombers)
- 326th Heavy-Bomber Division (formerly 6952nd Airbase in Ukrainka deploying Tu-95MS strategic bombers).

Additional Tupolev Tu-22M3 Backfire bombers were deployed in 2020 at the Belaya air base (with the 200th Guards Heavy Bomber Regiment subordinate to the 326th Division) and at the Shaykovka air base (with the 52nd Heavy Bomber Regiment subordinate to the 22nd Division). The 40th Mixed Aviation Regiment at the Olenya air base in the Northern Fleet operational area also flies the Backfire. Backfire regiments operate in either the land- and/or maritime-strike roles, incorporating long-range stand-off supersonic and hypersonic cruise missiles.

Russian Long-Range Aviation includes a Refueling Aviation Group with Ilyushin Il-78 tankers.

In February 2017 and during 2019–2023, Sergey Kobylash was commander of Russian Long-Range Aviation.

As a result of the Russo-Ukrainian War, the Tu-22M3 contingent at the Olenya air base in the Murmansk region was reportedly reinforced in 2025 when bombers, likely from the Belaya air base in Siberia, were deployed to the region. Tu-95MS Bear bombers have reportedly also used Olenya in carrying out strikes in Ukraine.
