= Belaya air base =

Military airport in Irkutsk Oblast, Russia

Belaya/Irkutsk
- Белая/Иркутск
- Usolye-Sibirskoye, Irkutsk Oblast in Russia
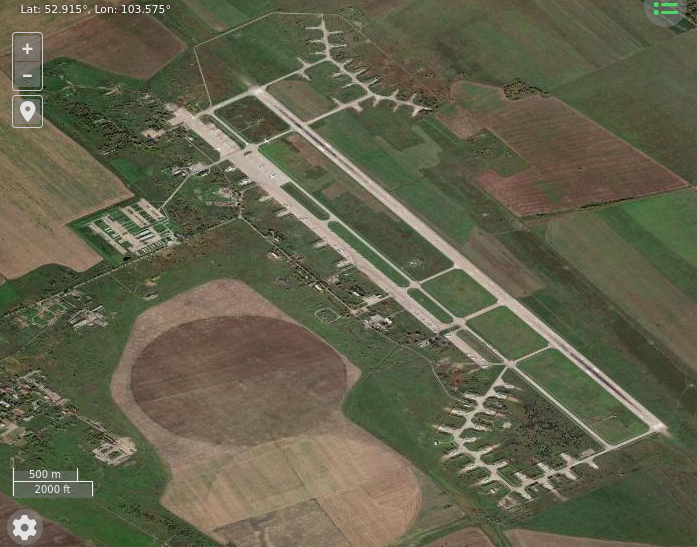
- Satellite imagery of Belaya air base

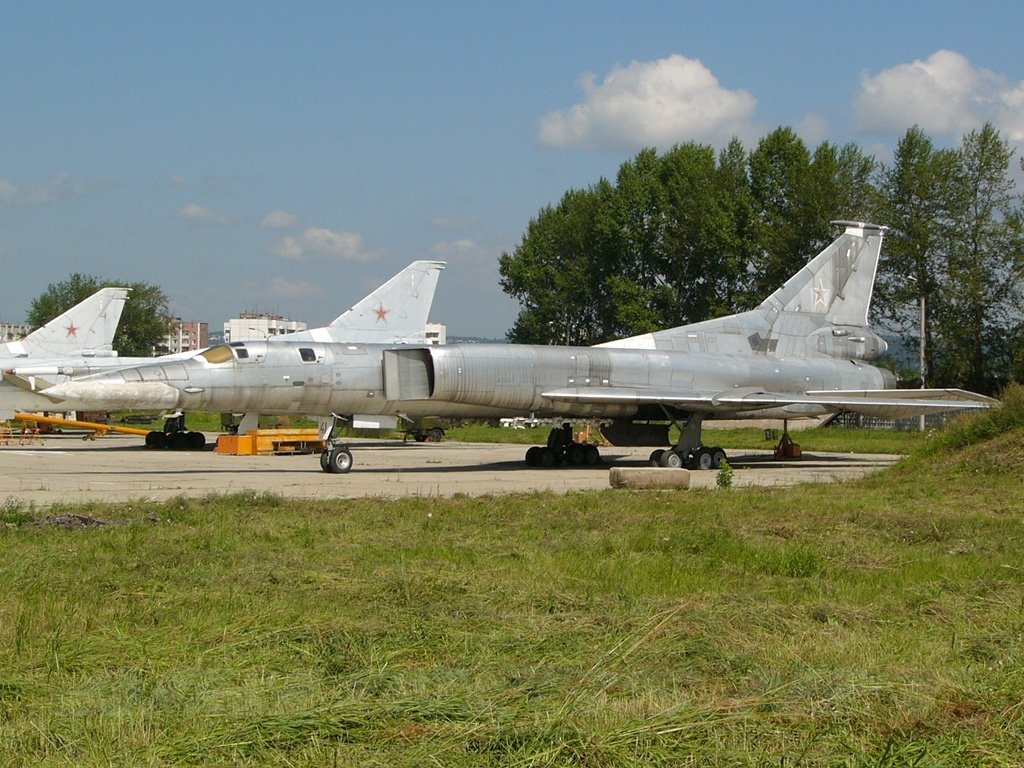
- A pre-production Tupolev Tu-22M at the base

Site information
- Type: Air base
- Owner: Ministry of Defence
- Operator: Russian Aerospace Forces
- Controlled by: Long-Range Aviation

Location
- Shown within Irkutsk Oblast Belaya (Russia)
- Coordinates: 52°54′54″N 103°34′30″E

Site history
- Built: 1946
- In use: 1946 – present

Airfield information
- Identifiers: ICAO: UIIB
- Elevation: 458 metres (1,503 ft) AMSL
Runways
Direction	Length and surface
15/33	4,000 metres (13,123 ft) concrete

Belaya (ICAO: UIIB) is a significant Russian Aerospace Forces Long-Range Aviation base in Usolsky District, Irkutsk Oblast, Russia, 18 kilometres (11 mi) north of Usolye-Sibirskoye and 85 kilometres (53 mi) northwest of Irkutsk. From 2009 it has sometimes been known as Srednii. It has significant ramp space and 38 bomber revetments.

The base is home to the 200th Guards Heavy Bomber Aviation Brest Red Banner Order of Suvorov Regiment with the Tu-22M3, the 444th Heavy Bomber Aviation Regiment with the Tu-22M3 and the 181st Independent Composite Aviation Squadron with the Antonov An-12 and the Antonov An-30. All of the regiments are under the control of the 326th Heavy Bomber Aviation Tarnopol Order of Kutuzov Division.

The base's bomber fleet, consisting at various times of Tupolev Tu-16, Tupolev Tu-22, and Tupolev Tu-22M aircraft, played a considerable role in Asian strategy. The base was especially important in projecting power against the People's Republic of China following the Sino-Soviet split of the late 1960s.

== History ==
=== Soviet era ===
An air defense unit, the 350th Fighter Aviation Regiment PVO (Military Unit: 65319), arrived at Belaya in 1946 or 1950 and was equipped with the Mikoyan-Gurevich MiG-17, 1955–1962, the Sukhoi Su-9, 1961–1967, and the Tupolev Tu-128 (NATO: Fiddler) from 1967.

In 1954 Belaya was used as a staging base for Tupolev Tu-4 aircraft sent to China to observe American fusion bomb tests in the Pacific, but the runway was unpaved at this time. Sometime around the late 1950s the airfield was upgraded and it received nuclear bomber missions starting during the late 1960s.

By 1982 Western intelligence showed that Belaya supported two Tu-22M2 Backfire-B regiments subordinate to the Irkutsk Air Army, and a PVO air defense Tu-128 Fiddler regiment subordinate to the Novosibirsk Air Defense District.

In 1984 the air defense regiment moved to Bratsk Airport. It was in succession part of the 26th Air Defence Division, the 39th Air Defence Corps, and the 54th Air Defence Corps. However, the bomber regiments remained.

Units stationed at Belaya from 1945 to 1994 included:

- 1225 TBAP (1225th Heavy Bomber Aviation Regiment) flying Tupolev Tu-4 aircraft in 1956-1958 and upgrading to Tupolev Tu-16 in 1958 and Tupolev Tu-16K in 1961. It began flying the Tupolev Tu-22M2 starting in 1982 and retained this aircraft through at least the 1990s. Disbanded 1994.
- 1229 TBAP (1229th Heavy Bomber Aviation Regiment) flying the same aircraft and receiving the same upgrades at the same times as 1225 TBAP. Disbanded 1994.

=== Post-Soviet era ===
As the 1225 and 1229 TBAPs were disbanding in 1994, the 200th Guards Brestskiy Red Banner order of Suvorov Heavy Bomber Aviation Regiment appears to have been arriving from Bobruisk, Mogilev Oblast, by that time part of Belarus. The 200th Guard TBAP had been at Bobruisk since May 1946. Once it arrived at Belaya, it came under the control of the 326th Heavy Bomber Aviation Division. As of 2006, Google Earth imagery showed a total of 26 Tupolev Tu-22M medium-range bombers visible in revetments, increasing to 36 as of 2018.

On 1 December 2009, the 200th Guards TBAP was reorganized as the 6953rd Guards Airbase, which later, in December 2010, reformed as an Air Group of the 6952nd Guards Air Base (Ukrainka).

In 2020, the Tu-22M3 bomber of the 200th Guards Heavy Bomber Regiment was reported deployed as part of Russian Long Range Aviation.

=== Russo-Ukrainian war ===
On 1 June 2025, the Security Service of Ukraine (SBU) claimed to have damaged "more than 40" aircraft at Belaya and three other air bases (including Olenya) by using drones. The aircraft included an unspecified number of A-50, Tu-95 and Tu-22 M3 type aircraft. They released footage of the drones striking aircraft on the runway.

== See also ==
- List of military airbases in Russia
