= Mys Shmidta Airport =

Mys Shmidta Airport Аэропорт Мыс Шмидта
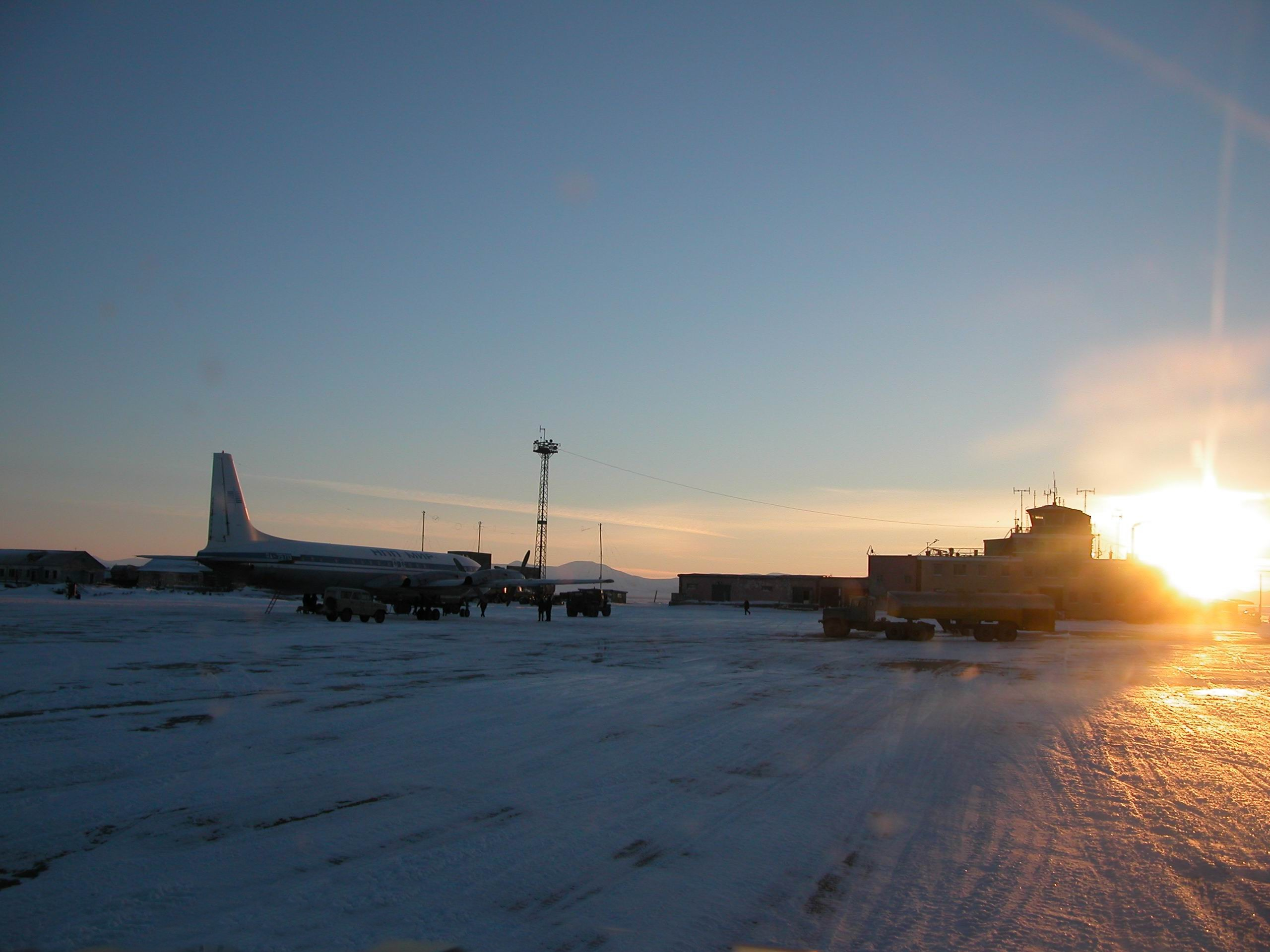
- IATA: none; ICAO: UHMI; LID: МШД

Summary
- Airport type: Public
- Operator: Chukotavia
- Location: Mys Shmidta, Shmidtovsky District, Chukotka, Russia
- Elevation AMSL: 20 ft / 6 m
- Coordinates: 68°52′06″N 179°22′32″W

Map
- Location of airport in Chukotka

Runways
Direction	Length		Surface
Direction	m	ft	Surface
14/32	2,450	8,202	Concrete

Mys Shmidta Airport (Russian: Аэропорт Мыс Шмидта) (ICAO: UHMI), also known as Cape Shmidt Airport, is a former military airbase in the Iultinsky District of Chukotka, Russia. It is located 3 kilometres (1.9 mi) southeast of Mys Shmidta. It is a major airfield with a 2,450 by 60 metres (8,038 ft × 197 ft) concrete tarmac. It was built in 1954 as an Arctic staging base for intercontinental bomber flights, with caretaker services provided by OGA (Arctic Control Group). The gravel overrun suggests that the runway was to eventually be extended to 3000 m. Unlike airports such as the Provideniya Bay Airport, which has always been a civilian airport, or the Iultin Airport, which was constructed specifically to serve the needs of the remote mine nearby, the Mys Shmidta airport was initially part of the ring of forward staging bases used by the Arctic Control Group (OGA) prior to intercontinental ballistic missiles gaining favour as the primary means of long-range defense.

== Accidents ==
- On July 6, 1989, 4 minutes after takeoff from the Cape Shmidt airfield, the engines on the Il-14 ice reconnaissance aircraft failed; Due to a forced landing on the water surface of the lagoon, the plane was seriously damaged. The crew members escaped with minor injuries.
- On February 1, 1995, during a landing approach, due to a piloting error, an An-28 aircraft made a rough landing 15 meters before the end of the runway. After the impact, the plane separated from the ground and landed a second time at a distance of 20 meters from the beginning of the runway. The plane stopped at a distance of 225 meters from the end of the runway. As a result, the plane was seriously damaged. There were no fatalities.

== Airlines and destinations ==
Airlines	Destinations
Chukotavia	Anadyr, Egvekinot, Pevek

== Gallery ==
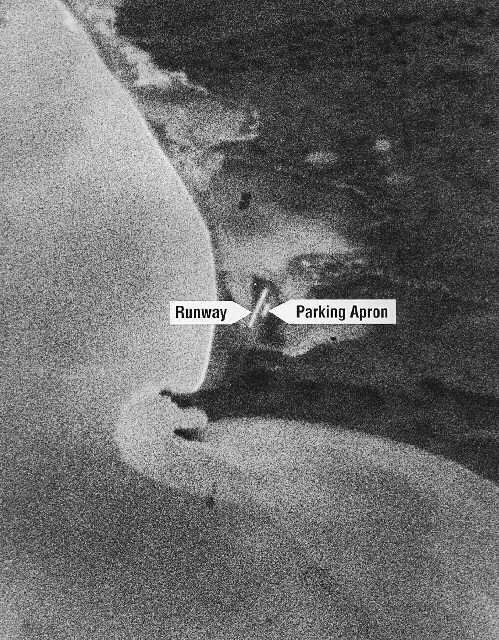
Mys Shmidta Airport, 1960. The first recovered image from the Corona spy satellite (North is roughly toward the bottom of the picture).

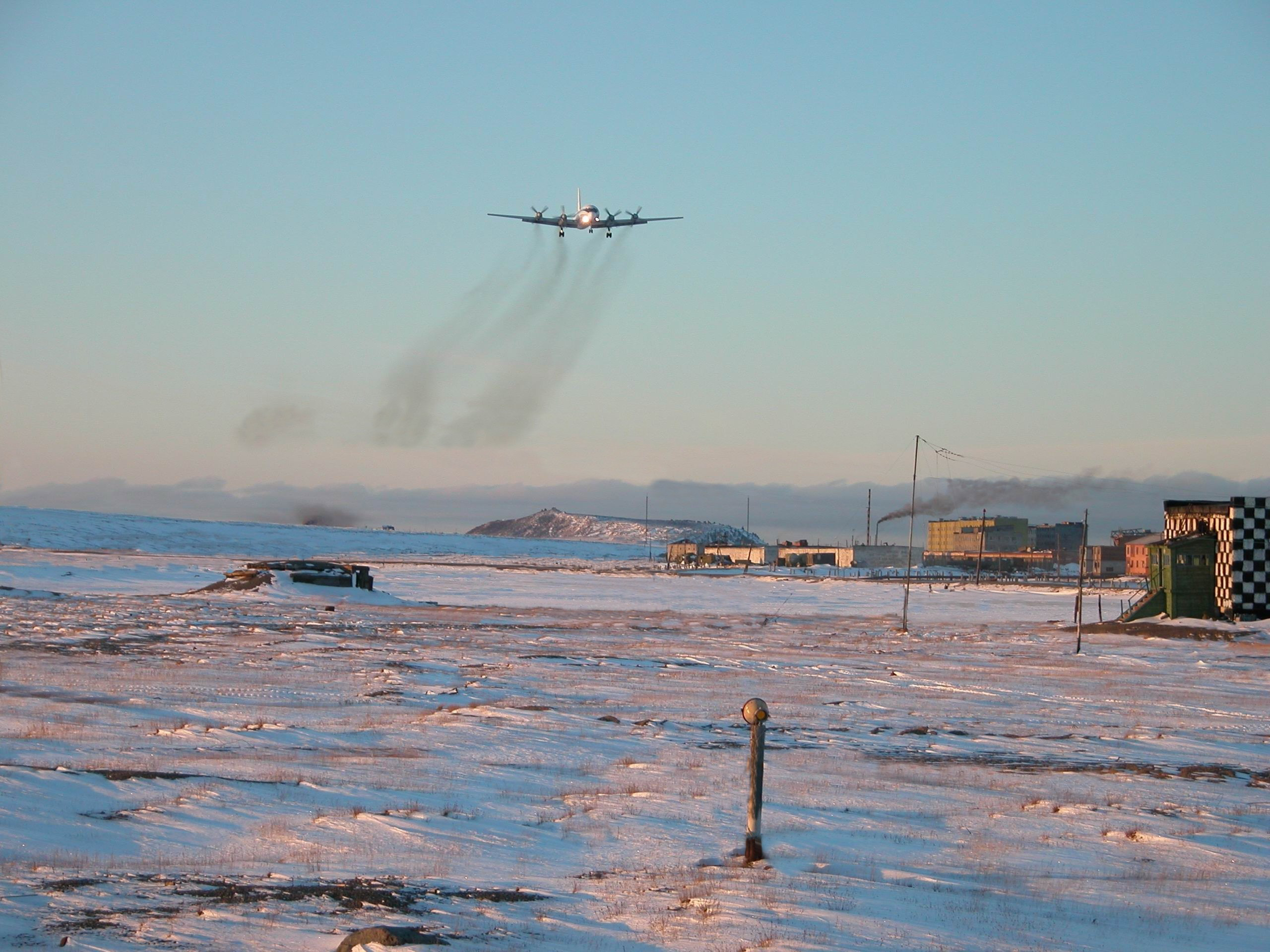
Ilyushin 18c taking off from Cape Schmidt Airport.

== See also ==
- Chekurovka, abandoned Arctic staging base
- Ostrov Bolshevik, abandoned Arctic staging base
- Tiksi North, abandoned Arctic staging base
- Tiksi West, abandoned Arctic staging base
- Dresba, abandoned Arctic staging base
