= Soviet Long Range Aviation =

Sub-branch of the Russian Aerospace Forces

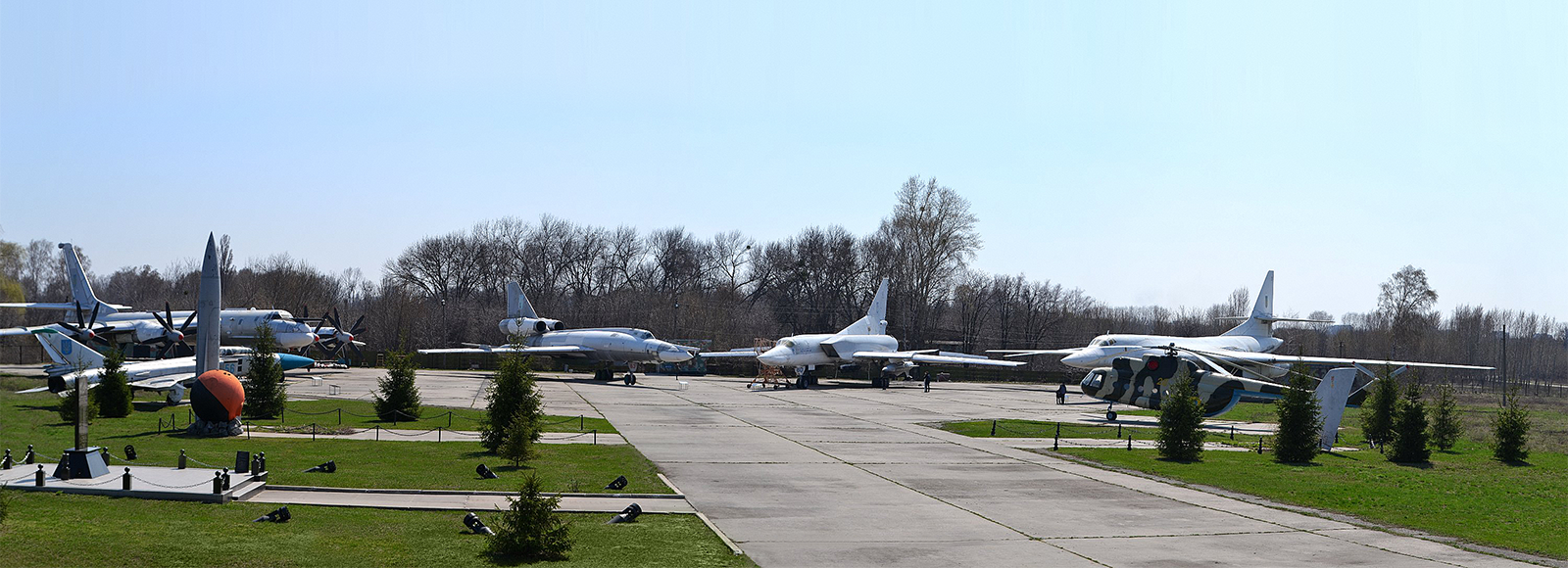
Tu-95, Tu-22, Tu-22M, Tu-160 Long-Range Aviation aircraft

Soviet Long Range Aviation (Russian: Авиация дальнего действия, romanized: Aviatsiya dal'nego deystviya, literally Aviation of Distant Action and abbreviated DA) was a sub-branch of the Soviet Air Forces responsible for delivering long-range nuclear or conventional strikes by aircraft (rather than missiles).

During the Cold War, the Long-Range Aviation of the Air Forces (DA VS) was the rough Soviet equivalent to the French Air Force's Forces aériennes stratégiques (1964-present); the British RAF Bomber Command (1936-68); and the United States Air Force (USAF) Strategic Air Command (1946–1992). In the early 2020s there are roughly-equivalent structures within the People's Liberation Army Air Force and in the USAF Air Force Global Strike Command.

Long-Range Aviation traces its history to the Aviation of Distant Action, AДД, or ADD, Авиация дальнего действия, and the 18th Air Army of the Second World War and beforehand. This article sketches the development of Soviet and Russian long-range bomber forces from their origins in the mid–1930s.

== Origins (1936–1940) ==
The first three Air Armies, designated Air Armies of Specific Purpose (or Particular Purpose) were created between 1936 and 1938.

In accordance with the predominant Deep operations doctrine, the Red Army was reorganized into six echelons, of which the long-range aviation was the 1st echelon. The 2nd echelon consisted of: heavy tanks; the 3rd echelon: medium and light tanks; the 4th echelon: the motorised infantry; the 5th echelon: heavy artillery; and the 6th echelon comprised the Main Force: the rifle troops, with their own integral tank support.

The 1st Specific Purpose Air Army was formed on 8 January 1936 as 1st Air Army of the General Reserve Command (Specific Purpose Army - 1) (1-я авиационная армия резерва главного командования (РГК) (АОН – 1)) headquartered at Monino Airfield. The initial TO&E established by the General Staff included two heavy-bomber air brigades (of Tupolev TB-3), one fast-bomber air brigade (of Tupolev SB) and one fighter air brigade. As the Ilyushin DB-3 entered service, they formed long-range bomber squadrons.

The 2nd Air Army was created on 15 March 1937 in the Far East, headquartered in Khabarovsk. The 3rd Air Army was created on 21 May 1938 in the North Caucasus Military District, headquartered in Rostov-on-Don.

On 20 October 1939 the three air armies' order of battle included:

- 1st Specific Purpose Army (Monino)
  - 27th Aviation Brigade at Monino (9th Air Base)
    - 21st and the 53rd Long Range Bomber Air Regiments
  - 13th Aviation Brigade at Migalovo (24th Air Base)
    - 41st Fast Bomber Air Regiment and
    - 6th Long Range Bomber Air Regiment at Ivanovo (12th Air Base)
- 2nd Specific Purpose Army (Voronezh)
  - 64th Aviation Brigade at Voronezh (112th Air Base)
    - 7th and the 42nd Long Range Bomber Air Regiments
  - 30th Aviation Brigade at Kursk (115th Air Base)
    - 51st Fast Bomber Air Regiment and
    - 45th Long Range Bomber Air Regiment at Oryol (141st Air Base)
- 3rd Specific Purpose Army (Rostov-on-Don)
  - 3rd Aviation Brigade at Rostov-on-Don (12th Air Base)
    - 1st Heavy Bomber Air Regiment and
    - 12th Long Range Bomber Air Regiment at Novocherkassk (7th Air Base)
  - 7th Aviation Brigade at Zaporizhia (16th Air Base)
    - 8th and 11th Long Range Bomber Air Regiments

On 5 November 1940 the three Specific Purpose Air Armies were disbanded, due to their poor combat performance during the Winter War with Finland.

The three armies were restructured as an integrated: Long-Range Bomber Aviation of the Stavka, the Red Army supreme command (Дальнебомбардировочная авиация Главного командования Красной Армии (ДБА ГК)). The structure now comprised: five air corps, three separate air divisions and one separate air regiment.

== Second World War (1941–1945) ==
The crews of the DBA GK performed their first combat sorties on June 22, 1941, bombing enemy troop concentrations in the Suwałki and Przemyśl areas. On June 23, long-range bombers together with Soviet naval aviation bombed Danzig, Königsberg, Warsaw, Kraków, and Bucharest. On the night of August 10–11 of the same year, naval aviation bombers of the Baltic Fleet and 81st Heavy Bomber Aviation Division DBA GK launched an air strike on the capital of the Reich, the city of Berlin.

In the difficult initial period of the war, the centralized control principal of the DBA GK was violated, large losses of aircraft and crews, and formations were constantly reorganised. The forces of the DBA of the Red Army Civil Code were divided into small groups, as a result, 74% of all aircraft sorties were lone rangers, for 1941, were produced with the aim of directly supporting the troops on the battlefield, which was not the force's main purpose.

In August 1941, the Supreme High Command had to abolish the corps link command and control from the DBA GK, since the loss of forces reached 65% of the original composition in June of the same year, and in the Active Army only seven air divisions remained. The state of affairs in the DBA GK, by the beginning of 1942, left much to be desired, therefore, in order to preserve the forces of the DBA GK, centralize their control, and ensure their massive use by the VGK, they decided and created Long-Range Aviation (ADD), as a separate branch of the Air Force, by the decree of the State Defence Committee, dated March 5, 1942 in order to carry out strategically important tasks:

- bombing strikes on administrative-political and military targets deep behind enemy lines;
- Violations of enemy transport communications;
- destruction of warehouses in the near rear;
- Bombardment of the enemy on the front line to support strategic operations.

In addition, the ADD (including the Civil Air Fleet, GVF, which is part of it) was widely used to provide partisan movement both on occupied territory of the USSR, and in Yugoslavia, Czechoslovakia and Poland, and performing special tasks, such as delivery of intelligences, reconnaissance and reconnaissance and sabotage groups, providing assistance to the Resistance in Axis-occupied Europe and many others.

Formations of the ADD were allocated from the Red Army Air Force directly subordinate to The Headquarters of the Supreme Commander-in-Chief (SVGK). Eight long-range bomber Aviation Division, several airfields with a hard surface were transferred to long-range aviation, and a control, recruitment, logistics and repair system independent of the Red Army Air Force was created.

Long-range aviation at that time consisted of more than 1300 TB-3, TB-7 and IL-4 bombers.

In 1941, LRA headquarters moved into the Petrovsky Palace in Moscow.

On 5 March 1942, Stavka reorganized the Long-Range Bomber Aviation as an autonomous force: the Long-Range Aviation (Авиация дальнего действия (АДД)), under the command of Alexander Golovanov. The force remained directly subordinate to Stavka and independent of the mainstream VVS-PVO. Its focus was strategic: bombing missions on administrative, political and military targets deep in the enemy's rear; disruption of enemy transport networks; destruction of enemy logistics hubs, beyond the tactical front; and specialist strategic missions. The core of this specialist bomber-force was the long-range Ilyushin Il-4 bomber, though Petlyakov Pe-8s and other aircraft were also used.

Later, the mobilized Civil Air Fleet was added to the ADD. This large and experienced transport force was widely used to support guerrillas deep in the occupied territory of the USSR. Some missions later extended the support to include the partizans of Yugoslavia.

Throughout its existence, the ADD was part of the Reserve of the Supreme High Command (RVGK) and took its orders from the Supreme Commander, Iosef Stalin.

During the Battle of Stalingrad, the ADD, having taken crippling losses over the past 18 months, was restricted to flying at night. The Soviets flew 11,317 night sorties over Stalingrad and the Don bend sector between 17 July and 19 November 1942. These raids caused little damage and were of nuisance value only.

The five long-range bomber corps had, at various times, nearly 3000 aircraft, of which 1800 were combat aircraft. The heavy bombers struck the cities of Danzig, Königsberg, Kraków, Berlin, Helsinki, Tallinn and others.

The ADD took an active part in the operations in the Baltic States. On 9 March 1944 between 1500 and 2000 explosive incendiary bombs were dropped on residential areas of Tallinn. Results of two Soviet air raids: 40% of the buildings in the city destroyed, 463 dead, 649 injured and about 20,000 left without shelter. Harju Street was especially hard hit, along with the theater "Estonia", where a concert had just started. From 6 to 8 March 1944 the historical part of Narva was virtually wiped out; in the same month Tartu, Tapa and Jõhvi were also bombed.

In the period July–December 1944, the ADD made more than 7,200 sorties, dropping about 62,000 bombs with a total weight of 7,600 tons.

=== 18th Air Army ===
On 6 December 1944, the ADD was disbanded as an autonomous force and integrated into the Red Army Air Force. However, it retained its identity and role as the 18th Air Army (Vozdushnaya Armiya VA).

The composition of 18th Air Army included:

- Headquarters
- 1st Guards Smolensk Long-Range Bomber Air Corps
- 2nd Guards Bryansk Long-Range Bomber Aviation Corps
- 3rd Guards Stalingrad Long-Range Bomber Aviation Corps
- 4th Guards Gomel Long-Range Bomber Aviation Corps
- 6th Long-Range Aviation Corps
- 19th Long-Range Bomber Aviation Corps (until February 1945)
- Four separate bomber aviation divisions
- 62nd Air Division Long Range

== Long-Range Aviation of the Air Forces (1946–1991) ==
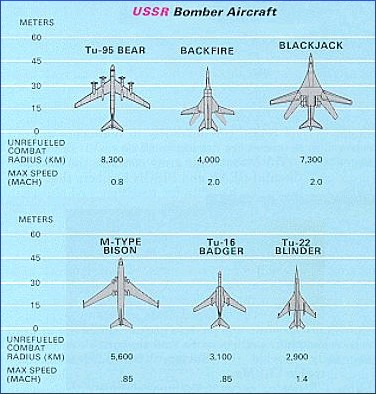
Comparison of Soviet Strategic Aviation aircraft towards the end of the Cold War

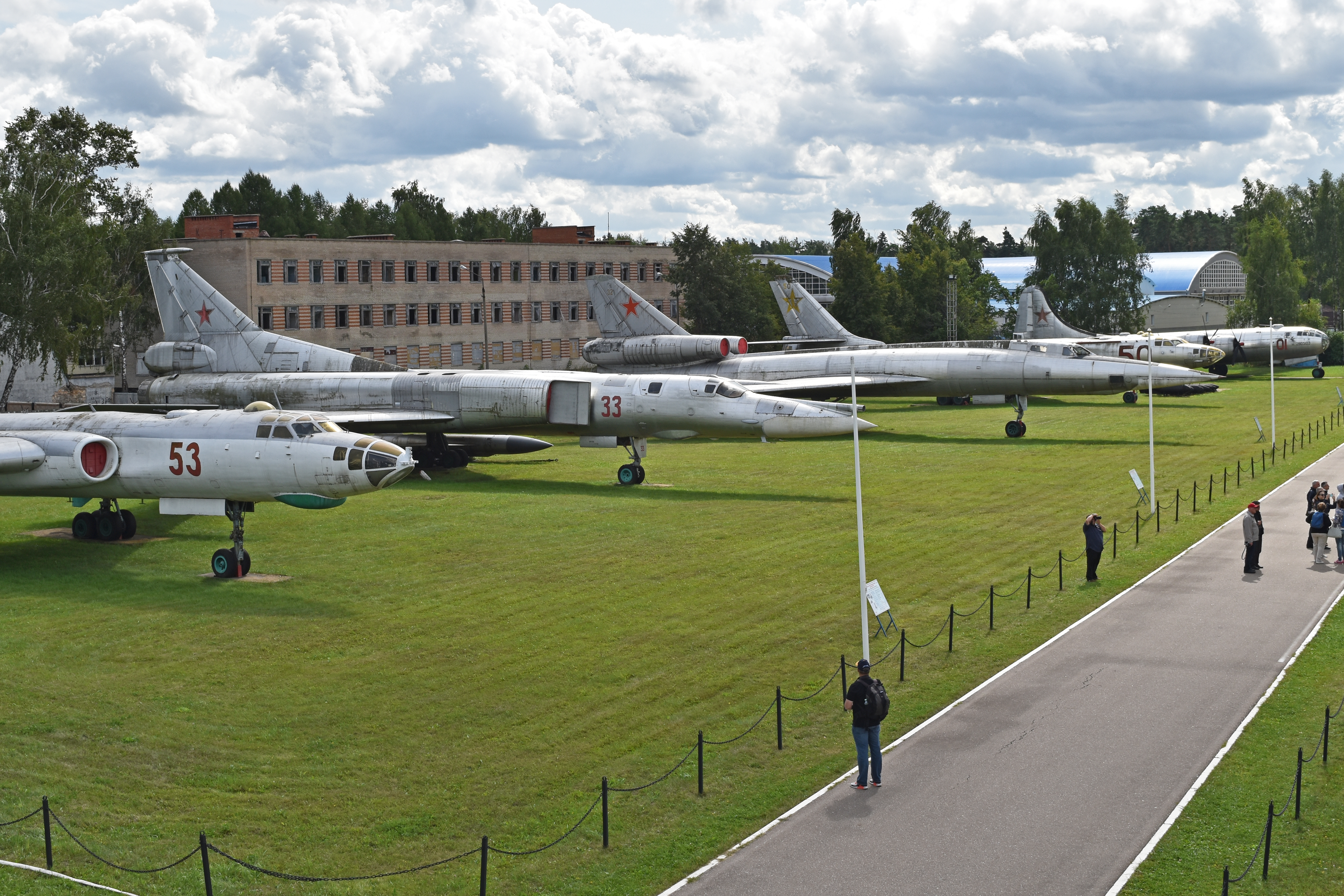
Line-up of Soviet Cold War heavy bombers of Soviet Strategic Aviation, from Tu-4 to Tu-22M

After the Second World War, strategic bombers were regrouped within the Long-Range Aviation of the Armed Forces (DA VS) in April 1946. The 7th Air Army in the West was reorganised as a long-range air army, the 3rd Air Army DA. The DA VS (Dal'naya Aviatsiya Vozdushnikh Syl - Long Range Aviation of Air Forces) consisted of:

- the 1st Air Army DA in Smolensk, commanded by Colonel-General of Aviation Nikolai Papivin (ru:Папивин,_Николай_Филиппович)
- the 2nd Air Army DA in Vinnitsa;
- the 3rd Air Army DA in Khabarovsk;

The 1st, 2nd, and 3rd Air Armies had established a reputation during the Second World War, for their work of direct tactical support to the Red Army ground forces. Therefore on 15 February 1949, the 1st Air Army DA was redesignated the 50th Air Army; the 2nd Air Army DA as the 43rd Air Army; and the 3rd Air Army DA in the Far East the 65th Air Army.

As the 1940s closed and the Cold War dawned, the Soviet Union scrambled to develop an instrument that could strike the United States. The only substantial aircraft that it was equipped with was the Tupolev Tu-4 (ASCC "Bull"), an exact copy of the Boeing B-29 Superfortress. This was fielded in 1949, and brought the first threat of attack to the United States, as missile technology at this time was still a decade away. However, the Tu-4 was incapable of returning to the Soviet Union, and the Soviet aircraft industry worked to develop an aircraft capable of round-trip operation.

The outcome of this competition was the highly successful Tupolev Tu-95, which entered service in the 1955–1956 period, and remained the backbone of Soviet air power against NATO for many decades. It continues in service with the Russian Federation. Myasischev's contribution was the Myasishchev M-4, but this aircraft fell below expectations. It surprisingly went on to serve an unexpected but vital role as the 3M aerial refueling tanker, which extended the reach of the strategic air fleet. Other aircraft in service with the DA during this period included the Tupolev Tu-22 (ASCC Blinder).

In 1954, the first Soviet long-range jet bomber Tupolev Tu-16 (ASCC Badger) entered service with Long-Range Aviation. As of January 1, 1955, Long-Range Aviation had 30 heavy bomber regiments, which were part of:

- two regiments(?) on Tu-16 bombers (54 aircraft with a staff of 130 aircraft);
- ten heavy bomber aviation regiments on the Tu-4 (63-94 aircraft in the division, 100% completed).

One division on the Tu-16 (43 aircraft) and one division on the Tu-4 (63 aircraft) were considered special (that is, formations of aircraft carrying nuclear weapons) and underwent appropriate training.

In addition to bombers, Long-Range Aviation included:

- five aviation regiments of long-range reconnaissance aircraft on Tu-4 aircraft (18 aircraft each with a staff of 22 Tu-4s);
- seven Mikoyan-Gurevich MiG-15bis fighter air regiments, consisting of two fighter air divisions (76 aircraft each with a staff of 116 aircraft) and one separate fighter air regiment (33 MiG-15bis with a staff of 36 aircraft);
- transport air division (35 Lisunov Li-2).

As of January 1, 1958, Long-Range Aviation was equipped with 1,120 Tu-16 jet bombers and 778 Tu-4 piston-engined bombers.

Since 1958, the so-called "engineering" regiments began to form as part of Long-Range Aviation (the first two based on the 362nd and 454th Heavy Bomber Aviation Regiments), which were actually intended for the R-12 and R-14, the first Soviet medium-range ballistic missiles. Ten such regiments were created by December 1959. From 1959, aviation regiments have been converted directly into missile regiments; in particular, the 37th, 198th, 229th, 250th, 157th Heavy Bomber Aviation Regiments. Several regiments of Tu-16 bombers were transferred to Soviet Naval Aviation (the 12th, 169th, 172nd and 240th Heavy Bomber Aviation Regiments).

In 1954–1955, as part of the Long-Range Aviation on Tu-4K aircraft, the 116th heavy aviation division was formed for the AS-1 (ASCC "Kennel") the first domestic projectile aircraft (the term " cruise missile" was introduced by order of the Minister of Defence (Soviet Union) instead of the term "projectile aircraft" in 1960.)

In 1957, the 65th Air Army was renamed the 5th Air Army and was relocated to Blagoveshchensk. As of 1 July 1960 in accordance with Soviet Air Force General Staff Order 322034, Long Range Aviation was reorganised into the 2nd, 6th, and 8th Separate Heavy Bomber Air Corps (OTBAK - Otdel'niy tyazhely bombandirovochniy aviatsionniy korpus) instead of Air Armies. This was due to increase in aircraft ordnance capacity, and the option of nuclear weapons ordnance. These three corps were formed from portions of the 43rd, 50th, and 5th Air Armies DA. At the same time, the 43rd and 50th Air Armies were transferred to the Strategic Rocket Forces, and became the 43rd Rocket Army and the 50th Rocket Army.

A classified U.S. Central Intelligence Agency report indicated that, at least during the early 1970s, there was no evidence of a quick-reaction posture; in other words, no airborne alert force and no quick-reaction crews on the ground. This stood in stark contrast to the United States Air Force, which was always at a high state of readiness. Furthermore, the 195 bombers belonging to Long Range Aviation were concentrated at only five primary airfields and spent most of their time there.

Until 1980, the DA VS existed as a separate service. In January 1980, the DA was disbanded and the heavy bomber units divided between three air armies:

- the 37th Air Army of the Supreme High Command (Strategic Purpose) (37 VA VGK (SN)), with its headquarters in Moscow
- the 46 VA VGK (SN) at Smolensk
- the 30th Air Army (30 VA VGK (SN)) with its headquarters at Irkutsk, 1980–1994.

In April 1987, the Tupolev Tu-160 entered operational service with the 184th Guards Heavy Bomber Regiment located at Pryluky Air Base, Ukrainian SSR. The regiment had previously operating Tu-16 and Tu-22M3 strategic bombers. Squadron deployments to Long Range Aviation began the same month, prior to the Tu-160's first public appearance in a parade in 1989.

In 1988, the three air armies were reunited once again to form the Long Range Aviation Command.

=== The Strategic Plan ===
In the event of a nuclear war with the United States, the Soviet Union would likely have committed its entire heavy bomber force to attacks against US targets. Medium-sized bombers would have been used in a peripheral role.

However elements of all of the Soviet Union's strategic forces would have been available to participate in Warsaw Pact operations. The CIA in 1975 estimated that 530 intermediate-range bombers west of the Urals, possibly augmented by Soviet Navy aircraft, were intended for European strikes in the NATO rear area that required large conventional or nuclear payloads.

Though basing forces in the Arctic would have posed more of a threat to North America, the hostile climate, poor logistical network, and weak defence network precluded such a plan. Therefore, the Soviet Union created a network of standby Arctic staging bases ('Bounce airdromes'; Russian: Аэродром подскока) under the control of OGA (Arctic Control Group), which would have been activated in wartime. These bases were airfields used for a short stop ("bounce") by airplanes for refueling and servicing for the purpose of extending the range of the flight, including long-range military (their Staging base).

They primarily included Olenegorsk, Novaya Zemlya Rogachevo Airport, and Vorkuta Sovetskiy in the northwest; and Tiksi Airport, Anadyr Ugolny Airport, and Mys Shmidta in the northeast. High-Arctic bases such as Nagurskoye and Greem-Bell may have been available to smaller aircraft, and the staging airfields Sredniy Ostrov, Dresba, Chekurovka, and Tiksi North were probably never completed. Though the Tu-95 could operate without the use of staging bases, nearly all other aircraft would have required the facilities in order to reach the United States.

Bomber crews were trained to be proficient in all basic aspects of strategic operations, including navigation, inflight refueling, air-to-surface missile strike procedures, Arctic staging, penetration tactics, and electronic countermeasures.

=== Order of battle (1990–91) ===
30th Air Army

Order of battle 1990

HQ: Blagoveshchensk, Amur Oblast

- 132nd independent Communications Regiment and Automated Control Battalion (Blagovechensk, Amur Oblast)
- 219th Long-Range Reconnaissance Aviation Regiment (Spassk-Dalny (Khvalynka), Primorskiy Kray) with Tu-16
- 31st Heavy Bomber Aviation Division (Belaya, Irkutsk Oblast)
  - 1225th Heavy Bomber Aviation Regiment (Belaya, Irkutsk Oblast) with Tu-22M2
  - 1229th Heavy Bomber Aviation Regiment (Belaya, Irkutsk Oblast) with Tu-22M2
- 55th Heavy Bomber Aviation Division (Vozdvizhenka, Primorskiy Kray)
  - 303rd Heavy Bomber Aviation Regiment (Zavitinsk, Amur Oblast) with Tu-16K
  - 444th Heavy Bomber Aviation Regiment (Vozdvizhenka, Primorskiy Kray) with Tu-16K

37th Air Army

See 37th Air Army

46th Air Army

Order of battle 1990

HQ: Smolensk

- 64th independent Communications Regiment (Smolensk, Smolensk Oblast)
- 103rd Guards Military-Transport Aviation Regiment (Smolensk, Smolensk Oblast) with An-12/24/26
- 199th Guards Long-Range Reconnaissance Aviation Regiment (Nizhyn Air Base, Chernihiv Oblast, Ukraine) with Tu-22R
- 290th Long-Range Reconnaissance Aviation Regiment (Zyabrovka, Gomel Oblast) with Tu-22R and Tu-16
- 13th Guards Heavy Bomber Aviation Division (Poltava Air Base, Poltava Oblast, Ukraine) Originated in 1940 as the 52nd Long-Range Bomber Aviation Division. Activated May 1943 as the 3rd Guards AD DD with the 10th Guards AP DD and the 20th Guards AP DD, both with Il-4; "Dnepropetrovsk" designation since October 1943 and "Budapest" since February 1945; order of the Red Banner 27th May 1944. Made a part of the 18th Air Army December 1944, now as the 13th Guards BAD with the 20th Guards "Sevastopol" BAP, 224th Guards "Rjevsko-Budapest" BAP and the 226th Guards "Stalingrad-Katovichi" BAP. In 1980 the division controlled three Heavy Bomber Aviation Regiments (52nd Guards in Shaykovka, 184th Guards in Priluki and 185th Guards in Poltava); in February 1986 184th Guards TBAP went to the 201st TBAD; in December 1989 52nd Guards TBAD went to the 43rd Centre for Combat Employment and Retraining (TSBP PeLS).
- 15th Guards Heavy Bomber Aviation Division (Ozerne Air Base, Zhytomyr Oblast, Ukraine)
- 22nd Guards Heavy Bomber Aviation Division (Babruysk (air base), Mogilev Oblast, Byelorussian SSR)
- 326th Heavy Bomber Aviation Division (Tartu, Estonia)

On 1 January 1991, the 46th Air Army included the following units:

- 64th Independent Communications Regiment (Smolensk)
- 103rd Guards Transport Aviation Regiment (Smolensk)
- 199th Guards 'Brest' Independent Long-Range Reconnaissance Regiment (Nezhin), 26 Tu-22R
- 290th Independent Long-Range Reconnaissance Aviation Regiment (Zyabrovka, Gomel Oblast)
- 13th Guards Heavy Bomber Aviation Division
  - 185th Guards Bomber Regiment (Poltava, Ukraine) - 22 Tu-22M;
- 15th Guards "Gomel" TBAD (Ozernoye, Zhitomir region)
  - 121st Guards "Sevastopol" TBAP (Machulishchi, Minsk region) with 34 Tu-22K
  - 203rd Guards "Orel" TBAP (Baranovichi, North Brest region) with 32 Tu-22K
  - 341st TBAP (Ozernoye, Zhitomir Oblast) with 32 Tu-22K
- 22nd Guards "Donbas" TBAD (Babruysk (air base), Mogilev Oblast)
  - 200th Guards "Brest" TBAP (Bobruisk, Mogilev Oblast) with 20 Tu-22M3 and 18 Tu-16K
  - 260th TBAP (Stryy, Lviv Oblast) with 18 Tu-22M3 and 23 Tu-16K
- 326th "Ternopol" TBAD (Tartu, Estonian SSR)
  - 132nd "Berlin" TBAP (Tartu) with 18 Tu-22M3 and 17 Tu-16K
  - 402nd TBAP (Balbasovo, Vitebsk region) with 17 Tu-22M3 and 7 Tu-16K
  - 840th TBAP (Soltsy-2, South Novgorod region) with 19 Tu-22M3

The 46th Air Army was disbanded in October 1994.
