= Vorkuta Sovetsky (air base) =

Military airfield in Komi Republic, Russia

Vorkuta Sovetsky
- Vorkuta, Komi Republic in Russia
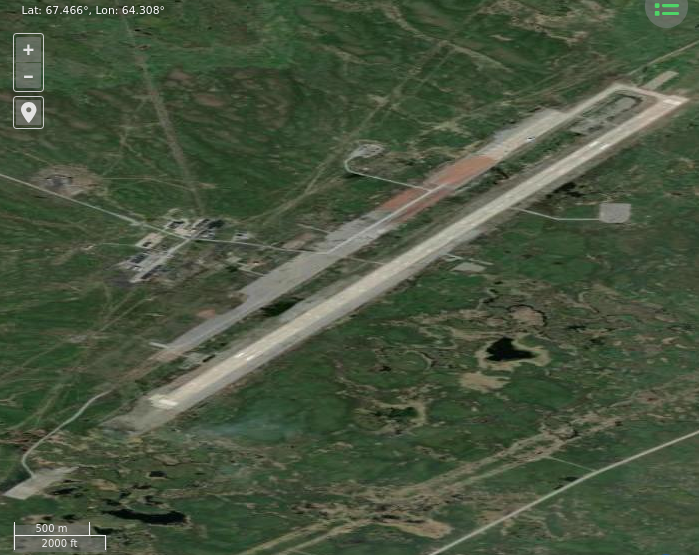
- Satellite imagery of Vorkuta Sovetsky

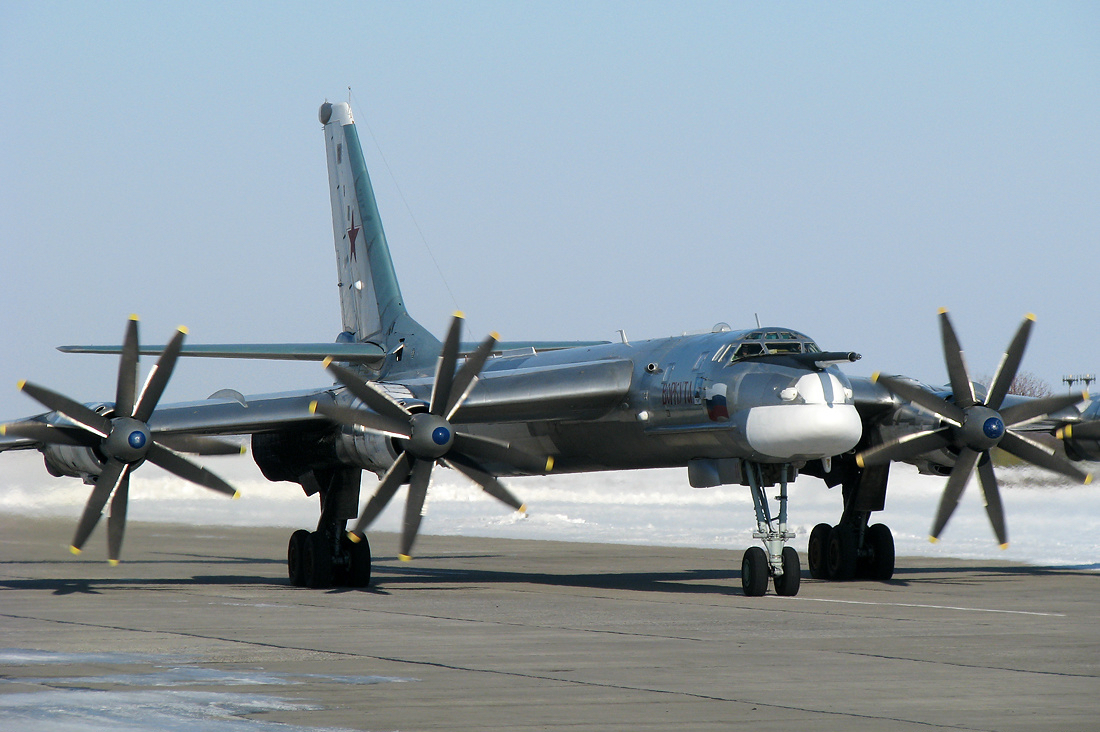
- Tupolev Tu-95 bomber in 2011.

Site information
- Type: Air Base
- Owner: Ministry of Defence
- Operator: Russian Air Force

Location
- Shown within Komi Republic Vorkuta Sovetsky (Russia)
- Coordinates: 67°27′56″N 64°18′28″E

Site history
- Built: 1960
- In use: 1960 - present

Airfield information
- Identifiers: ICAO: XUYK
- Elevation: 192 metres (630 ft) AMSL
Runways
Direction	Length and surface
01/19	3,550 metres (11,647 ft) Concrete

Vorkuta Sovetskiy (also known as Vorkuta East) is a military airfield in the Komi Republic, Russia, located 11 km east of Vorkuta. It was one of nine Air Army staging bases in the Arctic for Russian bomber units. It contains one of the largest runways in Russia's Arctic region.

Sovetskiy was built in the early 1960s as a staging base for intercontinental Long-Range Aviation bomber strikes (as a so-called 'bounce' airdrome). The airfield was first identified by Western intelligence in 1961. It is maintained by OGA (Arctic Control Group). The 364 OSAE (364h Independent Mixed Aviation Squadron) was based here between 1980 and 1994 with the Antonov An-12 (NATO: Cub), Antonov An-26 (NATO: Curl) and Mil Mi-8 (NATO: Hip).

== Sovetsky settlement ==
A small settlement, Sovetsky, stands to the north of the airfield.

== See also ==
- List of military airbases in Russia
- Chekurovka, abandoned Arctic staging base
- Aspidnoye (air base), abandoned Arctic staging base
- Tiksi West, abandoned Arctic staging base
