= 22nd Guards Heavy Bomber Aviation Division =

Russian Long Range Aviation formation

22nd Guards 'Donbass Red Banner' Heavy Bomber Aviation Division
- Emblem of 22nd TBAD
- Active: 1942–2008/2009; Since 2015/2016
- Country: Soviet Union; Russia
- Branch: (Soviet Union) Soviet Long Range Aviation; Russian Air Force
- Type: Strategic bombing
- Size: usually two to four regiments
- Part of: Russian Aerospace Forces, Long Range Aviation branch
- Garrison/HQ: Engels-2 air base, Saratov Oblast
- Equipment: Tu-95MS, Tu-22M3, Tu-160
- Engagements: World War II
- Decorations: Order of the Red Banner
- Battle honours: Donbass

Commanders
- Notable commanders: Nikolai Varpakhovich

The 22nd Guards Donbass Red Banner Heavy Bomber Aviation Division is a division of the Russian Aerospace Force's Long-Range Aviation branch having previously been a Soviet Air Forces formation. It was a Long Range Aviation division active from 1942 to 2008–9. Included in the 37th Air Army High Command. Commander of the division was Major General Alexander Blazhenko. It saw illustrious service during the Second World War, including supply of the Red Army in the Demyansk Pocket and the bombing of Berlin.

== History during the Second World War ==
=== 62nd Aviation Division long-range ===
The division was originally formed as the 62nd Aviation Division long-range order on the basis of a State Defence Committee Order of March 5, 1942, and Long-Range Aviation Commander Lieutenant General Aviation Golovanov on 6 March 1942. The division was formed at the air base Dyagilevo near the Ryazan-based 22nd Air Division. The regiments of the newly created military units were equipped with TB-3 heavy bombers. By mid-April 1942 formed the division relocated to the outskirts of Moscow airports Monino and Noginsk. At that time the division was part of the 6th Air Corps Long-Range.

The first flights were completed April 16, 1942, in North-Western Front Western Crimean and Voronezh fronts. The main task was to deliver cargo troops. Crews regiments of the division involved in the supply of the Red Army had kept the Germans in the Demyansk pocket. During the second half of April was carried out 324 sorties, dropped 323 tons of cargo. Cargoes discharged without parachutes from an altitude of 100 – 400 m. In April, the division suffered the first losses - some TB-3 was shot down by night fighters. In September 1942, regiments of the division were rearmed with Li-2 aircraft, which were used as bombers.

From September 1942 to February 1943 the regiments of the divisions were based on the ground at Michurinsky aerouzla and worked for Stalingrad and Don Fronts. Completed the division of war in the skies over Berlin and Swinemünde. The last raid was made on Swinoujscie May 2, 1945.

=== 9th Guards Aviation Division Long Range ===
For showing courage in fighting for their homeland against the German invaders, with persistence, discipline and organization, for heroism, the order of People's Commissariat of Defense (NKO) under the number 274 of September 18, 1943, the division was awarded the title of Guards. It became known as the 9th Guards Aviation Division Long-range, and 18 September, has since become an annual day of celebration Division. Later, the order of the NKO USSR May 27, 1944, to commemorate the victories in participating in the battles for the liberation of Donbass, the division was given the honorary name of Donbass.

=== 22nd Guards Bomber Aviation Division Donbass ===
In connection with the transformation of Long Range Aviation into the 18th Air Army and the dissolution of 6th Long-Range Aviation Corps, the Division from December 22, 1944, joined the 3rd Guards Bomber Aviation Corps. In accordance with a Directive of General Staff of the number Org/10/315706 December 26, 1944, the division was renamed the 22nd Guards Donbass Bomber Division.

By a decree of the Presidium of the Supreme Soviet of the USSR for its exemplary fulfillment of the command in the battles against the German invaders in the capture of the German capital - of Berlin, and displaying courage and heroism, the division was awarded the Order of Red Banner.

During the war, the crews of the division completed 14,965 sorties, dropping 14,178 tons of bombs destroyed 59 crossings, 10 g / d of nodes, destroyed 38 g / d trains, 30 aircraft on the ground, blown up 43 warehouses with ammunition and fuel.

For excellent military operations during World War II, the division was honored with the Supreme Commander's gratitude 13 times.

=== Composition during World War II ===
Regiment name	Period with division	Previous name (i)	Previous name (ii)
11th Guards Bomber Aviation Regiment Stalin's Redso called from 12/26/1944 to 05/09/1945.	Part of the division from 06.03.1942 on 01.05.1946.	The 14th Aviation Regiment-range (c 06.03.1942 to 26.03.1943)	11th Guards Air Regiment, Stalin's Red long-range (with 26/03/1943 to 12/26/1944).
220th Guards Bomber Aviation Regiment so called from 12/26/1944 to 05/09/1945.	Part of the division from 06.03.1942 on 04.05.1946.	4th Guards Stalingrad Red long-range aviation regiment (with 08/18/1942 to 12/26/1944).	250th Aviation Regiment-range (from 04/16/1942 to 08/18/1942)
325th Aviation Regiment-range - so called from 03/06/1942 to 19/08/1944.	Part of the division from 3.6.42 to 19.8.44.		
339th Bomber Aviation Regiment - so called from 12/26/44 to 07/09/47.	Part of the division with 3.19.44 on 7.9.47.	339th Bomber Regiment Long-Range (from 19.03.1944 to 12.26.44).	

== Cold War History ==
At the end of May 1945, the 111th Bomber Aviation Regiment of the 50th Bomber Aviation Division, and the headquarters of the 22nd Guards Bomber Aviation Division was relocated to Bobruisk.

In April 1946 the division's units included:

- 200th Guards Bomber Aviation Regiment (Babruysk (air base), Mogilev Oblast) with North American B-25 Mitchell
- 210th Guards Bomber Aviation Regiment (Zyabrovka, Gomel Oblast) with B-25
- 111th Bomber Aviation Regiment (Bobruisk, Mogilev Oblast) with B-25
- 330th Bomber Aviation Regiment (Bobruisk, Mogilev Oblast) with B-25

330th Bomber Aviation Regiment disbanded on November 24, 1949.

In 1950, division flyers were among the first in the Air Force to master the new Tupolev Tu-4 long-range bomber. Then, in 1955, the division was the first in Long Range Aviation to receive the Tupulev Tu-16 jet bomber. And in 1964 - the supersonic missile Tu-22. The 111th Bomber Aviation Regiment was disbanded February 1, 1971. In 1986 the division reequipped with the Tupolev Tu-22M3 long-range bomber.

Since 1980, the division was part of the 46th Air Army VGK.

After the start of transformation of 22nd Guards TBAD regiments were (in 1960–1980, respectively):

- 121st Guards Heavy Bomber Aviation Regiment (Machulishchy, Belarus)
- 200th Guards Heavy Bomber Aviation Regiment (Babruysk (air base), Belarus)
- 203rd Guards Heavy Bomber Aviation Regiment (Baranovichi, Belarus)
- 210th Guards Bomber Aviation Regiment, retired from the Division November 13, 1959

Thereafter the 121st Guards Heavy Bomber Aviation Regiment was armed with the strategic Tu-160. The crews of the connection belongs to the leadership in the development of in-flight refueling supersonic missile.

In the late 1980s, 121 and 203 Guards Guards TBAP were reassigned to the 15th Guards Heavy Bomber Air Division, and in the 22nd TBAD became the 260th TBAP, formerly part of the 15th TBAD.

As of 1991 was part of the 46th Air Army. In the division were:

- 200th Heavy Bomber Aviation Regiment (aircraft Tu-22M3 Bobruisk, Belarus). The regiment was removed from the division in 1993 in connection with the relocation of the division from Belarus to the Urals. The 200th TBAP is now based at Belaya (air base) in the Irkutsk region.
- 260th Heavy Bomber Aviation Regiment (aircraft Tu-22M3 Tu-16 Stryi (air base), Ukraine) - taken over by Ukraine in 1992

== Operations since 1991 ==
After the collapse of the Soviet Union directive of the General Staff from May 20, 1994, the division headquarters were ordered to relocate to Engels-2 airbase near Saratov. The division was in-pace at Engels from 1 June 1994.

- 203rd Guards Air Regiment Orlovsky (air refueling tankers), after the relocation to Ryazan to September 1, 2000, transferred to the direct subordination of the Commander of the 37th Air Army
- 182nd Guards Heavy Bomber Air Sevastopol-Berlin Red Regiment, retired from the Division May 1, 1998

In 2004 the division's commander was Maj Gen Anatoly Zhikharev. The same year, the division was awarded the Defense Minister's banner for courage, military prowess and a high standard of military training. On 17 January 2004 flight training took place, 11 Tu-160 flights were made.

In June 2006, two aircraft took part in "Shield of Union" joint Russian-Belarusian exercises. In September 2006 command-staff exercises and missile launches took place. In July 2007, flight exercises took place. In October that year, the site was inspected by Air Force staff. In August 2008 two Tu-160 flew over the Atlantic Ocean and the North Pole. 11 September 2008 a flight to Venezuela was mounted. 21.01.2009 two Tu-160 12 hours flight in Norway Sea and North Pole region. Planned staff 2009: 16 Tu-160 + 14 Tu-95MS. 06.2009 2 Tu-95MS patrol over North and Atlantic Ocean. 21.10.2009 flight patrol by 2 Tu-160 and 2 Tu-95MS. 18–19.11 and 24–25.11.2009 patrol over North Atlantic Ocean. 18.12.2009 Tu-95 flight patrol. 01,02,04,06.2010 patrol flights.

The composition of the division as of 2008-09 included:

- 121st Guards Heavy Bomber Aviation Regiment (Tu-160 aircraft) (Engels-2 airbase);
- 184th Guards Heavy Bomber Aviation Regiment (Tu-95MS aircraft) (Engels-2 airbase);
- 52nd Guards Heavy Bomber Aviation Regiment (ru:52-й гвардейский тяжёлый бомбардировочный авиационный полк) (Tu-22M3 aircraft) (Shaykovka);
- 840th Heavy Bomber Aviation Regiment (Tu-22M3 aircraft) (Soltsy).

As part of the Russian military reform (2008), the division was disbanded and reorganised as the 6950th Aviation Base, incorporating the former 121st and 184th Regiments. The unit's full honorific title was the 6950th Guards Donbass Red Banner Airbase, and its Military Unit Number (V/Ch) is 06987.

In 2015/16, the division was reformed at Engels within the Russian Aerospace Force's Long-Range Aviation branch flying the Tu-160 (ASCC "Blackjack") and the Tu-95 (ASCC "Bear").

A subordinate regiment, 52nd Guards Heavy Bomber Regiment, equipped with the Tu-22M3 Backfire bomber, is based at the Shaykovka air base. On 14 January 2023, an aircraft from the 52nd Heavy Bomber Regiment, participating in the Russo-Ukrainian War, fired a Kh-22 missile that hit a block of flats in Dnipro, killing numerous civilians. Ukraine has classified this act as a war crime.

On September 3, 2026, Major General Nikolai Varpakhovich, commander of the division, was reportedly shot and seriously wounded in Engels, Saratov Oblast. Russian authorities confirmed that a military serviceman had been shot but did not initially identify the victim; Russian media reported that the victim was Varpakhovich. Ukrainian authorities had previously accused him of ordering the July 2024 missile strike on Kyiv's Okhmatdyt children's hospital.

== Notes ==
- Holm, Michael (2011-09-01). "22nd Guards Donbass Red Banner Heavy Bomber Aviation Division".
