= 50th Rocket Army =

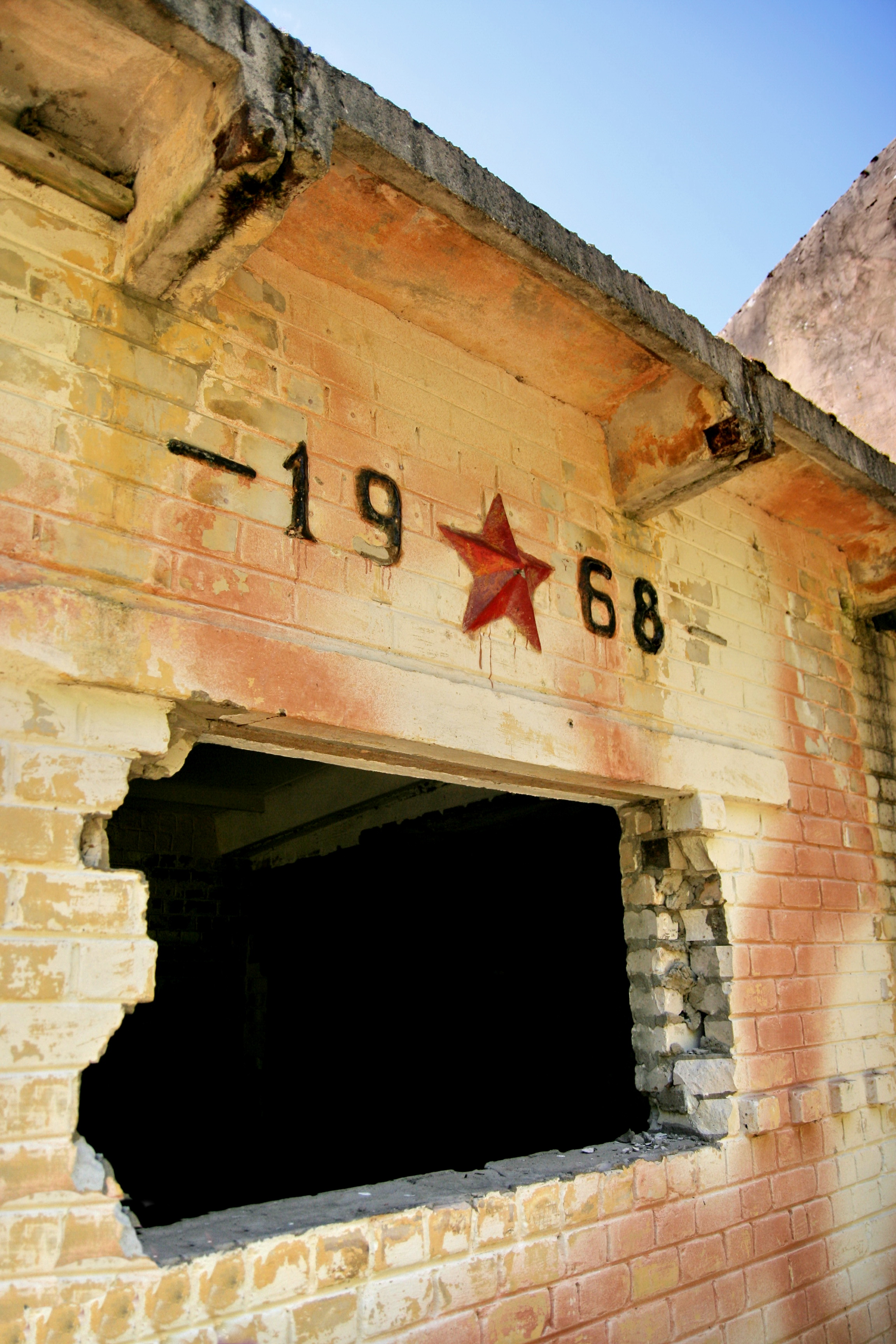
Remaining wall of the rocket base barracks near Vepriai, Lithuania. Construction date visible

The 50th Red Banner Rocket Army (Military Unit Number 55135) was an army of the Soviet Strategic Rocket Forces. It was created in 1960. Its first commander was General Lieutenant Feodor Dobish (ru:Добыш, Фёдор Иванович). Its headquarters was located in Smolensk.

It was formed in September 1960, in accordance with the directive of the General Staff of the Soviet Armed Forces based on the 50th Air Army Long Range Aviation.

== History ==
=== Successive titles ===
- Air Forces of the Kalinin Front (from October 17, 1941), Military unit 49707;
- 3rd Air Army (May 5, 1942);
- 1st Army Long Range Aviation (April 9, 1946), Military unit 55135 (after 04.1946);
- 50th Air Army (Long Range Aviation) (February 20, 1949);
- 50th Rocket Army (August 1, 1960);

From November 1951 to July 1957 the army included the 144th Fighter Aviation Division with its headquarters at Mogilev, Mogilev Region, Byelorussian SSR. The division's 439th Fighter Aviation Regiment was flying MiG-15s and MiG-17s during that period from Zyabrovka, Gomel Oblast.

In the mid-1950s the Army included two Guards Heavy Bomber Aviation Corps, the 51st, including Tupolev Tu-4s, and the 79th, each with two divisions, and the 144th Fighter Aviation Division.

By September 1, 1960, the 50th Rocket Army had 46 medium-range rocket launchers on combat duty, and a year later their number had reached 144. By January 1, 1963, there were 296 launchers, by January 1, 1964, 330 (26 of them were mines), and by February 3, 1965, the program for the deployment of the north-western missile grouping was completed, which began to make up 351 launchers.

=== Operation Anadyr ===
In 1962, elements of the 50th RA were sent to Cuba to participate in Operation Anadyr, among them:

- 79th Guards Rocket Regiment with R-12 missiles (regiment commander Lieutenant Colonel I. S. Sidorov, deputy commander Lieutenant Colonel F. Z. Khachaturov);
- 1018th RTB (Chief of RTB, Lieutenant Colonel I. V. Shishchenko, Chief Engineer Major E. M. Orlov);
- The 1st Rocket Divizion of the 428th Rocket Regiment with R-14 missiles (division commander Lieutenant Colonel V. T. Polishchuk);
- 1st Assembly Brigade (chief lieutenant colonel Bazanov from rtb colonel Balin).

The first missile regiment to arrive, in record time, on October 20, 1962, took up combat duty 79th Guards Rocket Regiment under Lieutenant Colonel I.S. Sidorov. And on October 28, all 36 launchers were prepared for launch.

== Divisions ==
Võru was a deployment base for the 305th Regiment of the 23rd Rocket Division (from 1982 40th Division) of the 50th Army.

The 29th Guards Rocket Division was part of the 50th Rocket Army from 1960 to 1986, and included the Plokštinė missile base, operated by the 79th Guards Missile Regiment.

== Composition 1988 ==
In 1988 the 50th Rocket Army comprised:

- 7th Guards Rocket Division
- 24th Guards Rocket Division (Gvardeysk, Kaliningrad Oblast),
- 31st Guards Rocket Division (Pinsk, Brest Oblast)(former 14th Guards Heavy Bomber Aviation Division, which became 83rd Guards Bryansko-Berlinskaya Aviation (Missile) Division, renumbered July 1, 1960). Disbanded 31 December 1990.
- 32nd Rocket Division (Postavy, Vitebsk Oblast)
- 49th Guards Rocket Division (Lida, Grodno Region, 1963 to 1990). 18th Guards Red Banner Stanislavsky-Budapest Rifle Corps was reorganised as Headquarters 49th Guards Rocket Division, presumably in 1960.
- 58th Rocket Division (Karmėlava, Lithuania) Activated 30.5.61 in Kaunas, Lithuania, from the 175th Fighter Aviation Division. Amongst the division's regiments were:
  - 637th Rocket Regiment (Šiauliai, Lithuania), the complex R-12H until 1989, disbanded in 1989.
  - 324th Rocket Regiment (Ukmergė, Lithuania), a complex of R-12H until 1989, disbanded in 1989.
  - 42nd Rocket Regiment (Karmėlava, Lithuania), the complex R-12H until 1990 (it was the last regiment of the R-12 Dvina?)

Moved to Karmėlava on 30 June 1964, disbanded 8.1990.

The army was disbanded on 30 June 1990.
