= Tiksi Airport =

Airport in Sakha Republic, Russia

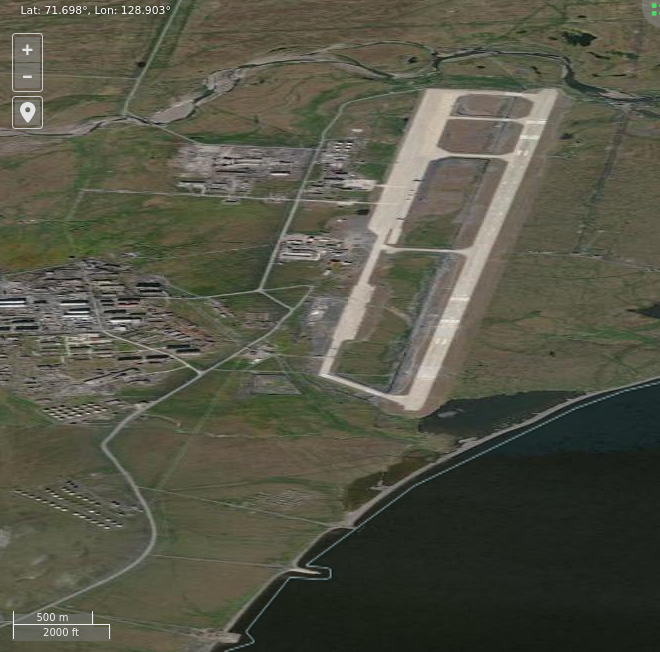
- Satellite imagery of Tiksi Airport

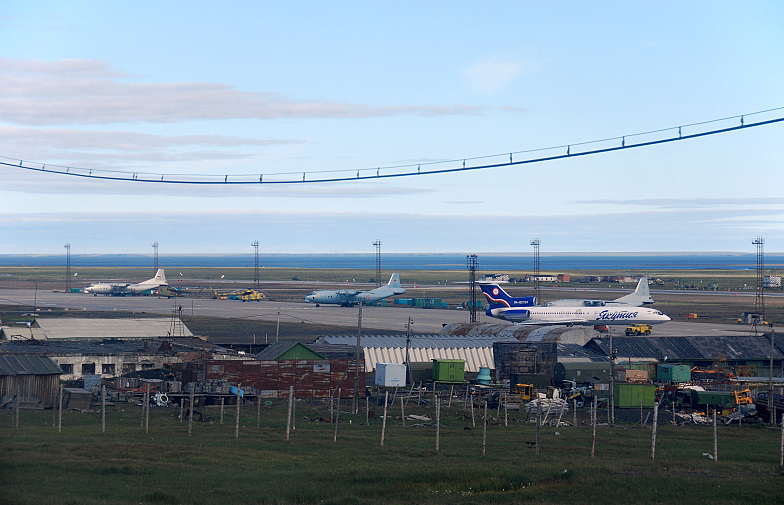
- IATA: IKS; ICAO: UEST; LID: ТСИ

Summary
- Airport type: Military
- Operator: Russian Aerospace Forces
- Location: Tiksi
- Elevation AMSL: 26 ft (7.9 m)
- Coordinates: 71°41′51″N 128°54′10″E

Map
- Location of the airport in the Sakha Republic

Runways
Direction	Length		Surface
Direction	ft	m	Surface
03/21	9,845	3,001	Concrete

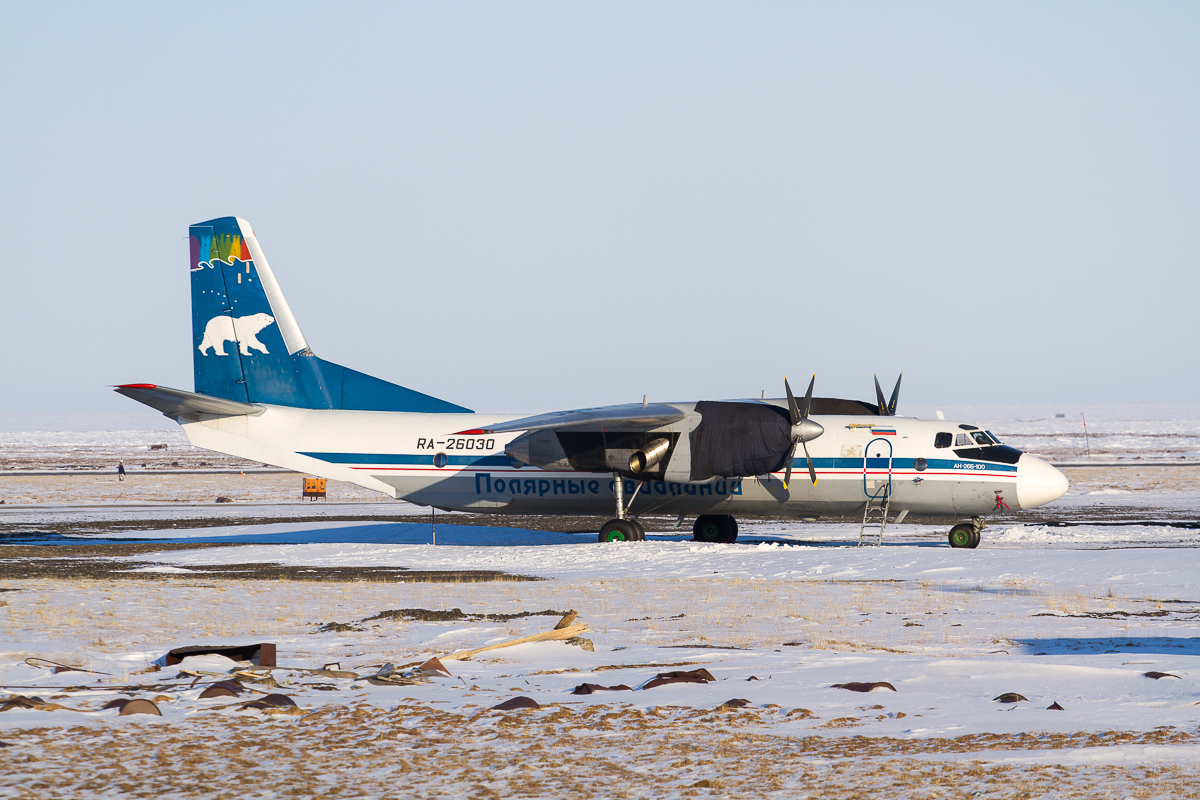
Polar Airlines Antonov An-26 at Tiksi Airport (2017)

Tiksi Aerodrome (Yakut: Тиксии Аэропорда, Tiksii Aeroporta) (IATA: IKS, ICAO: UEST) is located 1 km (0.6 mi) northeast of Tiksi, Sakha Republic, and was built in the 1950s as a staging base for Soviet Long Range Aviation bombers to reach the United States (as a so-called 'bounce' aerodrome). It is used regularly by Tupolev Tu-95 aircraft in military exercises, including one in 1999, in which bombers practice travelling to the Canadian arctic. Two other nearby airfields known as Tiksi North and Tiksi West have been abandoned for decades, and are probably unusable, according to satellite imagery.

The only scheduled service to Tiksi is by an Antonov An-24 turboprop airplane.

The base is home to the Aviation Command, 200th Guards Heavy Bomber Aviation Regiment with the Mil Mi-8 (NATO: Hip) of the 326th Heavy Bomber Aviation Division.

== 2012 closure ==
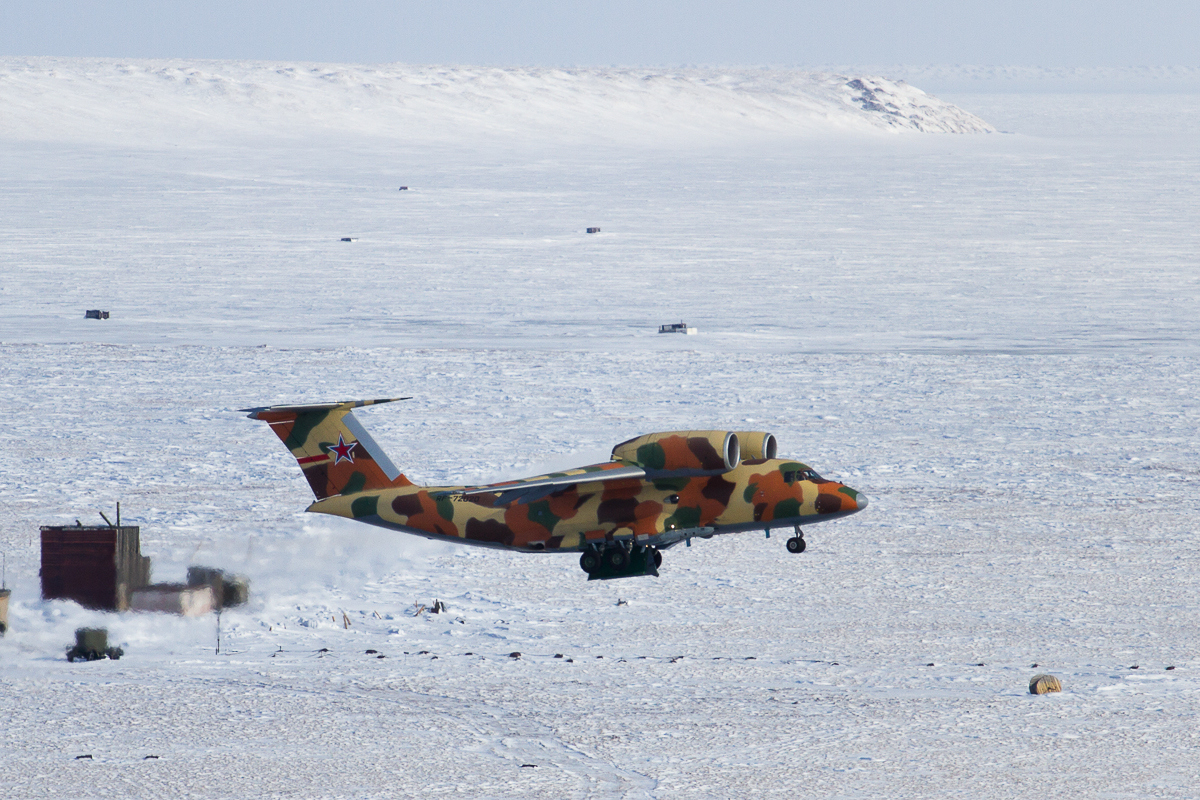
Russian Border Guards Antonov An-72P taking off from Tiksi Airport, 2017

The airport was closed without notice on October 1, 2012 by its owner, the Defense Ministry, due to the runway being unsafe and needing repair work. The closure was not coordinated with local or state government. Though the city was connected by winter roads, the loss of air service impaired the delivery of medicine, food and other essential goods, and in February 2013 boilers in the city went out of service for an extended period. The issue rose to the highest levels of Russian government. Prime Minister Dmitri Medvedev said in April 2013 "the Ministry of Defence committed a real mistake to jeopardize the existence of an entire village. This is an outrage.". Negotiations between the Defence Ministry and Yakutia government led to an agreement to Antonov An-24 service starting in June 2013.

Reconstruction of the runway in several phases was scheduled for 2013, with completion by about 2015 or 2016; the current (fall 2023) state of affairs is not clear.

In July 2014, ITAR TASS reported Roman Filimonov (Head of the Defence Ministry's Construction department), announcing that Russia would be building six military towns in their Arctic region. “These will be closed zones with comfortable living and service conditions,” he said, adding “We’re restoring the infrastructure of the Tiksi airport. We hope that the construction will be completed next year.”

== Airlines and destinations ==
Airlines	Destinations
Polar Airlines	Yakutsk
Yakutia Airlines	Moscow–Vnukovo, Yakutsk

== Accidents & incidents ==
- On 19 December 2016, an Il-18 of the Russian Aerospace Forces crashed on approach to the aerodrome. There were no fatalities among the 39 occupants, but several were carried to hospital injured.

== See also ==
- List of airports in Russia
- List of military airbases in Russia
