= Babruysk (air base) =

Military airfield near Babruyski, Belarus

Babruysk Air Base Аэрадром Бабруйск
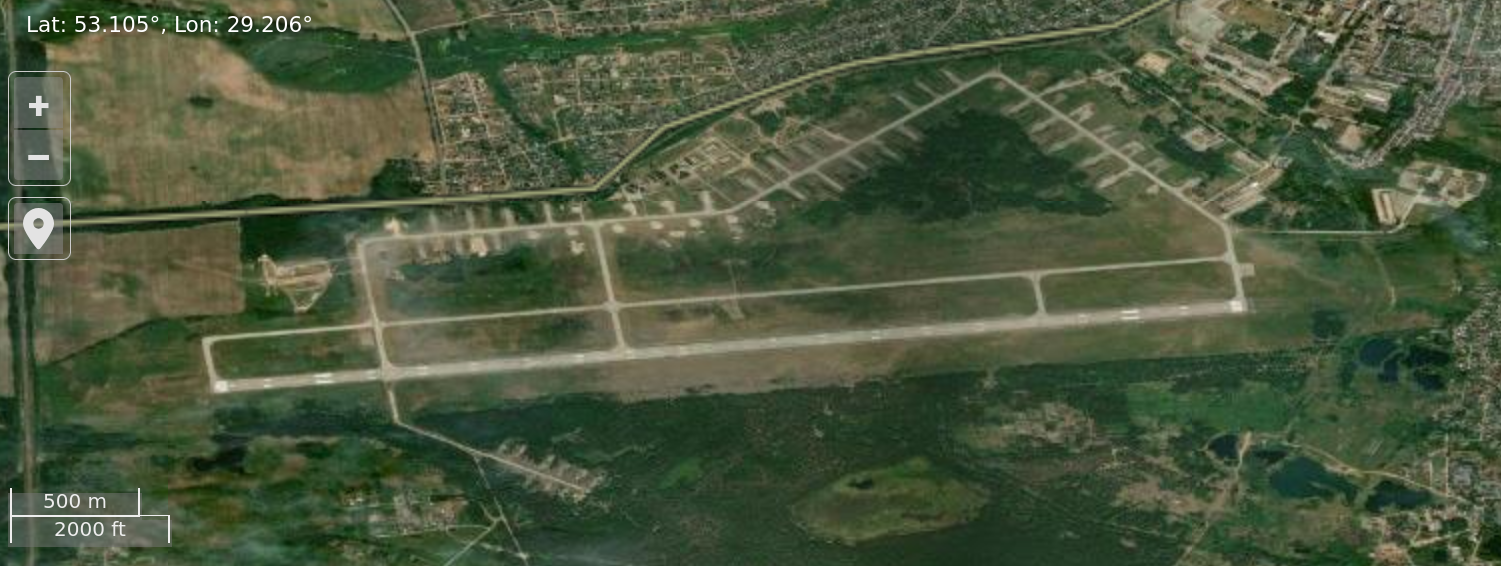
- Satellite imagery of Babruysk air base

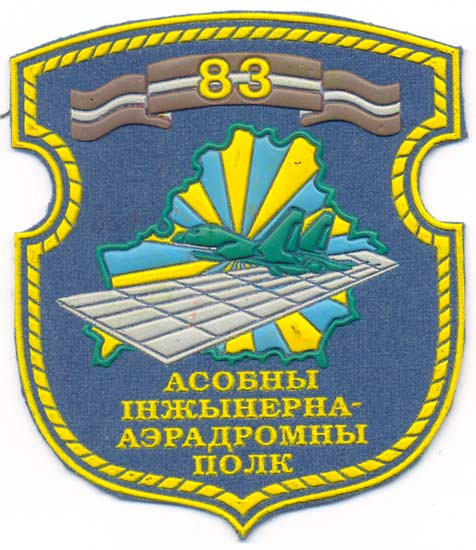
- 83rd Separate Engineer-Aerodrome Regiment patch
- IATA: none; ICAO: UMNB

Summary
- Airport type: Military
- Owner: Ministry of Defence of Belarus
- Location: Babruysk, Mogilev Region, Belarus
- Elevation AMSL: 502 ft / 153 m
- Coordinates: 53°6′17″N 29°12′21″E

Map
- Location in Belarus Babruysk Air Base (Europe)

Runways
Direction	Length		Surface
Direction	m	ft	Surface
08/26	3,000	9,843	Concrete

Babruysk Air Base (Belarusian: Аэрадром Бабруйск, Aeradrom Babruysk; Russian: Аэродром Бобруйск (ICAO: UMNB)) is a military airfield of the Air and Air Defence Force of Belarus, located in the south-western outskirts of Babruysk (Bobruisk), Belarus. The 83rd Separate Order of the Red Star Engineer-Aerodrome Regiment is at the base, which also functions as a spare airfield. It used to be a Soviet Long-Range Aviation air base.

== History ==
Fighter aviation regiments of the Red Army Air Force were using the aerodrome by 1938.

=== 1944–1994 ===
After the liberation of Babruysk in the summer of 1944, the airfield was used to provide air support for the further offensive of the Red Army. From the beginning of 1945, the staffing and training of the 330th Bomber Aviation Regiment of the 48th Bomber Aviation Division was carried out at the Babruysk airfield, which never took part in the fighting due to the end of the war and for which the airfield became a permanent base. (Note: IAP - Fighter Aviation Regiment; BAP - Bomber Aviation Regiment; RAP - Reconnaissance Aviation Regiment; (O)SAP - (Independent) Mixed Aviation Regiment (also sometimes translated as Composite Aviation Regiment); UAP - Training Aviation Regiment; UVP - Training Helicopter Regiment; 'IAP-PVO' indicates the regiment was part of the Air Defence Forces before 1998, and is air defence dedicated. 'IAP-VVS' indicates that a regiment was part of the Air Force before 1998, and, in most cases, they are regiments tasked with attaining tactical air supremacy. Only a few regiments have a type suffix added yet.; TsBPiPLS - Centre for Combat Training and Flight Personnel Training; APIB - Fighter-Bomber Aviation Regiment; APON - Aviation Regiment for Special Purposes; IBAP - Instructor Bomber Aviation Regiment; IISAP - Research Instructor Composite Aviation Regiment; IVTAP - Instructor Military Transport Aviation Regiment; OAPSZ - Independent Air Regiment of Tanker Aircraft; OIAP - Independent Fighter Regiment; OTBVP - Independent Transport-Combat Helicopter Regiment; OSAP - Independent Composite Air Regiment; OTBVP - Independent Transport-Combat Helicopter Regiment; OVP - Independent Helicopter Regiment; OVP BU - Independent Helicopter Regiment for Battle Control; OVTAP - Independent Military Transport Air Regiment; TBAP - Heavy Bomber Aviation Regiment; VTAP - Military Transport Aviation Regiment)

In the following years, up to 1994, the Babruysk airfield was used mainly by long-range bomber aircraft.

At the end of May 1945, the 111th Bomber Aviation Regiment of the 50th Bomber Aviation Division and the 22nd Guards Bomber Aviation Division headquarters were relocated to Bobruisk. In the summer of 1945, the following units were also deployed in Bobruisk: 6th Guards Bomber Aviation Division (moved to Chernyakhovsk in 1947), 3rd Guards Bomber Aviation Corps (disbanded in August 1956) and 1st Air Army (moved to Minsk in 1946).

In April 1946, the 111th BAP and the 330th BAP became part of the 22nd Guards BAD, and in May of the same year, the 200th Guards Bomber Aviation Regiment of the same air division was also transferred to the Bobruisk airfield. All three regiments were fully equipped with the American North American B-25 Mitchell medium-range bomber .

In November 1949, the 330th bap was disbanded, and the 111th bap and the 200th guards bomber aviation regiments were re-equipped with the first Soviet strategic bomber Tupolev Tu-4. Since 1950, these air regiments, as well as the 22nd Guards Bomber Aviation Division, became known as heavy bombers. In addition, in 1949–1951, the wooden covering of the airfield was replaced by concrete.

In the following years, the followingstrategic bombers were deployed at Bobruisk with the 111th TBAP and the 200th Guards TBAP (though the 111th TBAP was disbanded in February 1971.):

- Tu-4 – until 1956;
- Tu-16 – in the years 1955–1986;
- Tu-16K – in 1964–1992;
- Tu-22M3 – since 1986.

The 200th Guards TBAP also included a squadron of Tu-16N tanker aircraft.

Fighter aircraft also used the Bobruisk airfield in the 1940s and 1950s. In January 1946, the 4th Fighter Aviation Regiment of the 144th Fighter Aviation Division (144th IAD) arrived at the base. From October 1951 to November 1953, the 383rd Fighter Aviation Regiment of the 144th IAD, with Mikoyan-Gurevich MiG-15 airplanes was also at the airfield. In March 1958, the 4th IAP left the airfield, armed at the time by airplanes MiG-17.

According to Treaty on Conventional Armed Forces in Europe, as of January 1, 1991, there were 20 Tu-22M3 and 18 – Tupolev Tu-16K heavy bombers with the 200th TBAP.

At the aerodrome, two nuclear weapons repositories were also built (Kazakovo facility): 9 hydrogen bombs were stored in the mid-1950s, 200 in the later building nuclear warheads for cruise missile. By the end of 1994, all nuclear ammunition had been removed to the territory of Russian Federation, and the storage site/object was transferred to the balance of Bobruisk city executive committee and after – Bobruisk leshoz. As of 2014, the object was in an abandoned state with a destroyed infrastructure.

=== 1994–present ===
After the collapse of the USSR, the 22nd Guards Heavy Bomber Aviation Division was transferred to the jurisdiction of the Russian Federation, and in November – December 1994, the Air Division and the 200th Guards TBAP were redeployed with all aviation weapons from Belarus to Belaya air base (Irkutsk Region, Russia).

In 1994–2002, the Bobruisk airfield was home to the 13th separate combat control squadron of the helicopter Belarusian Air Force.

This aviation unit was formed in 1946 in Brest on the basis of the 994th separate aviation regiment of communications, receiving the name: the 13th separate aviation communications squadron, and was subordinated to the ground forces Belorussian Military District. Later, the squadron was reorganized into the 13th Separate Mixed Aviation Squadron and since 1960 it has been used for the aviation support of the headquarters 5th Guards Tank Army based at the airfield Kiselevichi, located on the northern outskirts of Bobruisk. In the 1980s, the squadron was reorganized into the 13th Separate Helicopter Squadron; it participated in the Soviet war in Afghanistan and mitigation of consequences of the Chernobyl nuclear accident.

In 1990, the 13 OW was part of the Aviation of the Soviet Ground Forces and, according to CFE, was equipped with: 2 helicopters - Mi-6, 3 helicopters - Mi-8 and several transport planes.

In June 1992, the 13 OWU became part of Air Force of the Republic of Belarus, in 1993 it was reorganized into the 13th separate combat squadron of a helicopter, in May 1994 it was relocated from the airfield Kiselevichi to the airfield Bobruisk.

In 2002, as part of the creation of a unified Air Force and Air Defense Forces troops of the Republic of Belarus and as a result of structural reorganization, 13 ove bu was disbanded, and the aircraft and flight personnel were transferred to the 50th a mixed aviation base, located at the airfield Machulishchi. At that time, the squadron was armed with helicopters: Mi-8, Mi-9 and Mi-22.

Since 2002, the Babruysk airfield has been managed by the 83rd Separate Order of the Red Star Engineer-Aerodrome Regiment of the Air and Air Defence Force of the Republic of Belarus. The 83rd Regiment contains an airfield in constant operational readiness, it ensures the reception and departure of aircraft from the airfield.
