= Monino (air base) =

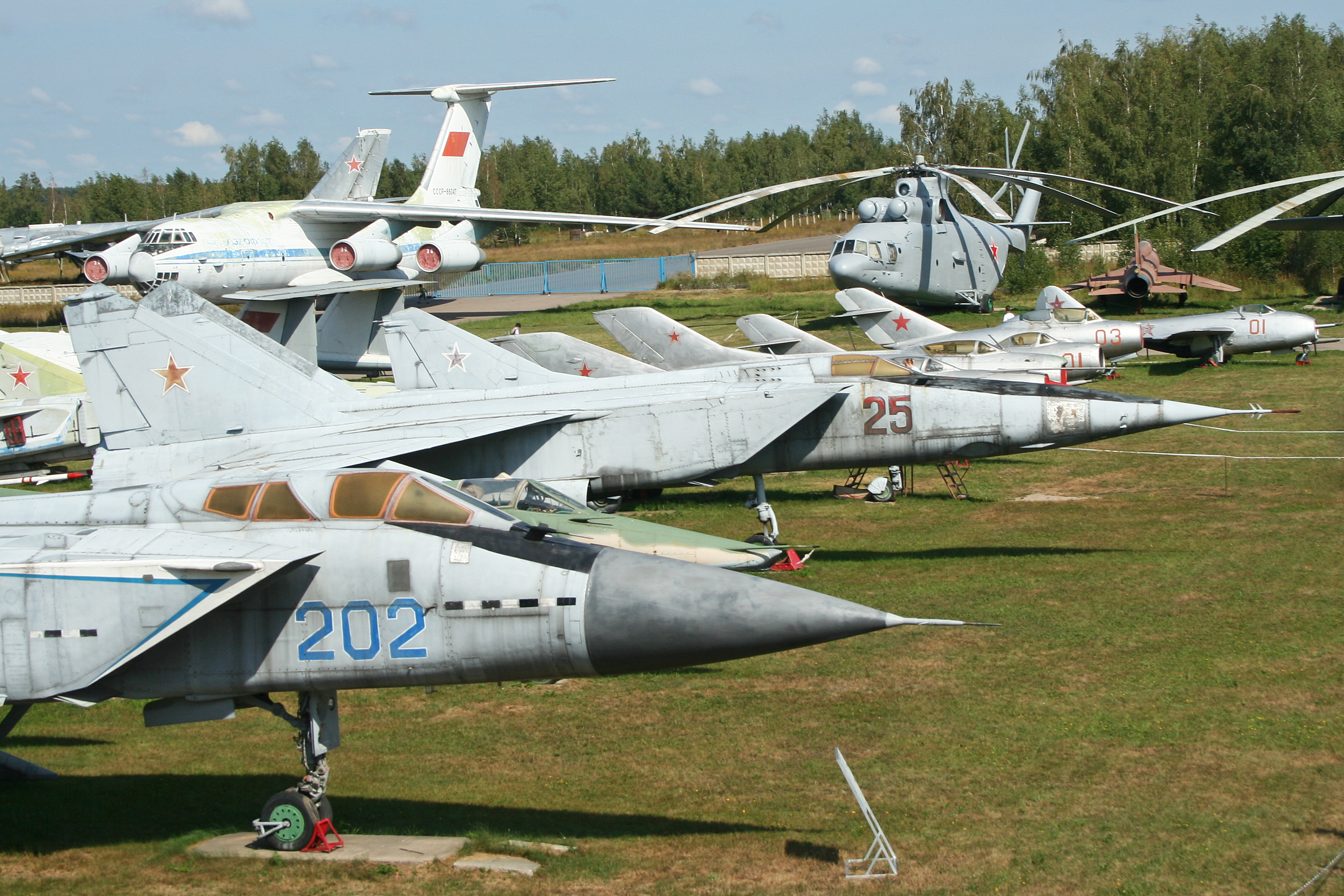
- IATA: none; ICAO: ZA8F

Summary
- Airport type: Military
- Operator: Soviet Air Force
- Location: Monino, Moscow Oblast, Russia
- Elevation AMSL: 499 ft / 152 m
- Coordinates: 55°50′12″N 38°10′12″E
- Interactive map of Monino

Runways
Direction	Length		Surface
Direction	ft	m	Surface
	Inop (formerly 4,265)	inop (formerly 1,300)	Concrete

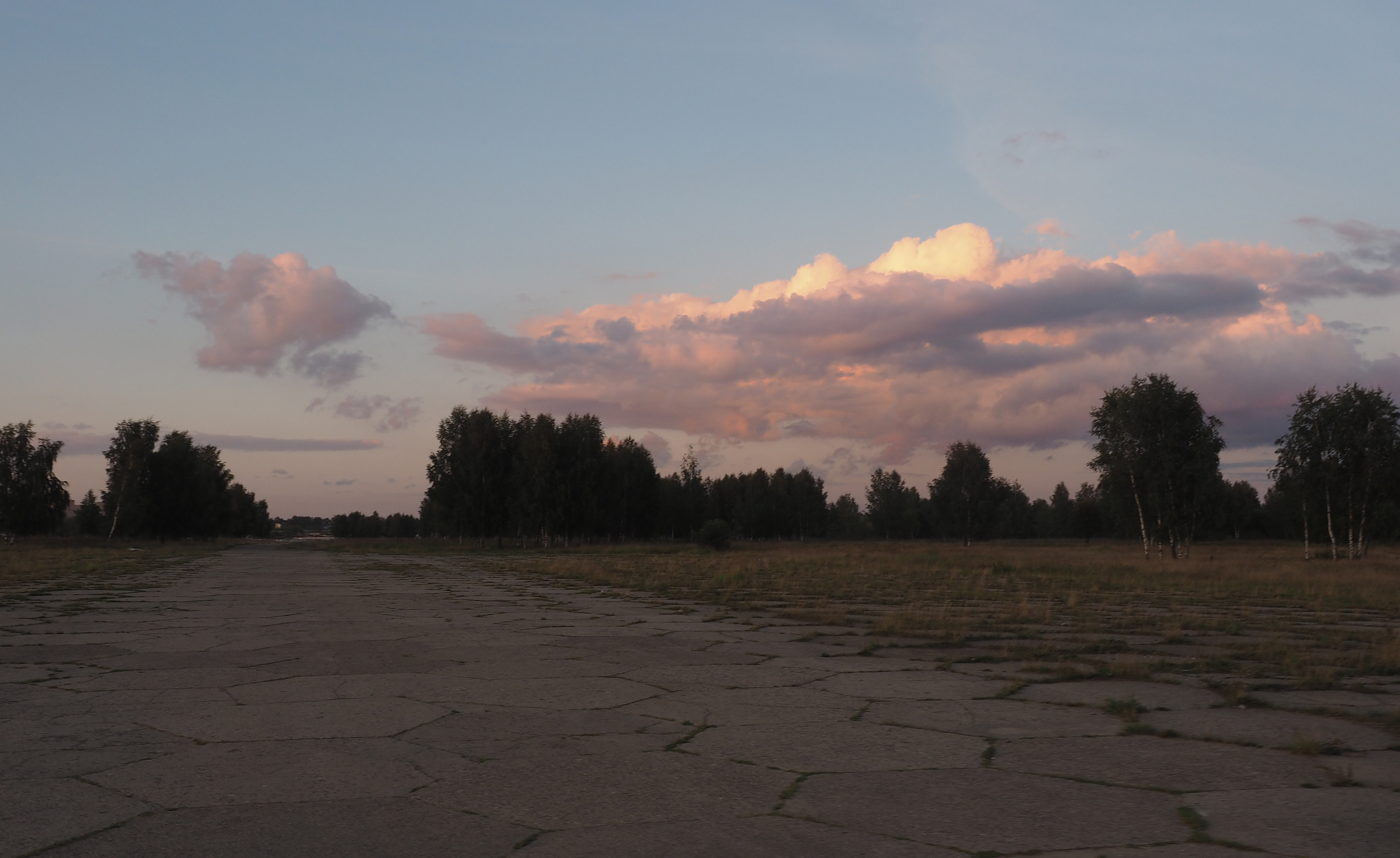
Abandoned runway of Monino airfield

Monino Airfield is a former military air base of the Soviet Air Force in Monino, Moscow Oblast, Russia. It is located 36 kilometers (22 mi) east of Moscow, and is best known for housing the Central Air Force Museum, one of the world's largest aviation museums and the largest for Russian aircraft. Monino Airfield was decommissioned from active service with the Soviet Air Force in 1956, however, the presence of the Gagarin Air Force Academy in Monino meant the air base's facilities saw minor usage, including a military technical school with an operations ramp which during the 1990s had an Ilyushin Il-76 freighter jet and two bombers. In 1958, construction of the Central Air Force Museum began on an unused section of Monino Airfield's grounds and opened in 1960, which has since expanded as new aircraft have been added to the collection. The remaining facilities of the air base, including the runway, are now abandoned.

== See also ==
- List of military airbases in Russia
