= Stryi Air Base =

Ukrainian air force base

Stryi
- Stryi, Lviv Oblast in Ukraine
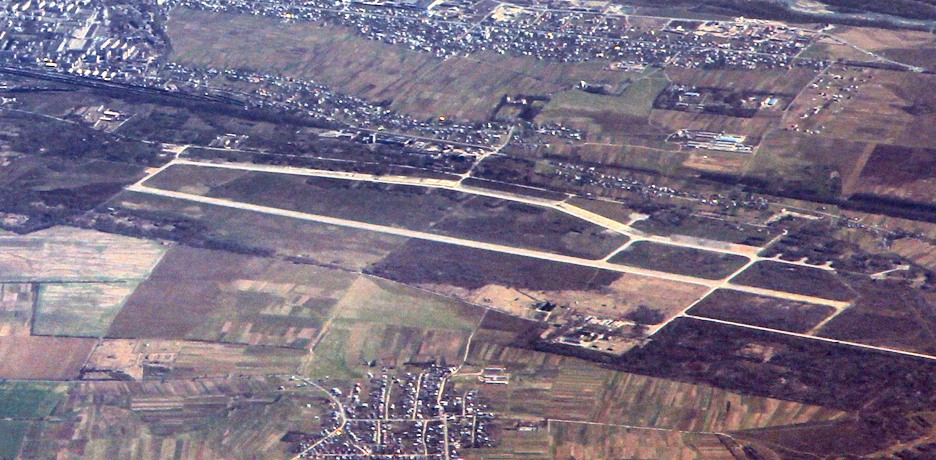

Site information
- Type: Air Base
- Owner: Ministry of Defence
- Operator: Ukrainian Air Force

Location
- Shown within Lviv Oblast Stryi (Ukraine)
- Coordinates: 49°14′36″N 023°47′12″E

Site history
- Built: 1957
- In use: 1957 - 1996

Airfield information
- Elevation: 312 metres (1,024 ft) AMSL
Runways
Direction	Length and surface
05/23	3,000 metres (9,843 ft) Concrete

Stryi (Ukrainian Стрий, also Stryi, or Stryy) was an air base in Lviv Oblast, Ukraine located 4 km southwest of Stryi. It was a large base with 6 km of parking area taxiways and numerous revetments.

== History ==
Units that have been stationed at Stryy include:

- 179th Fighter Aviation Regiment (179 IAP). The regiment flew Sukhoi Su-9 (ASCC: Fishpot) interceptors beginning in the 1960s, then in 1978 upgraded to the Mikoyan-Gurevich MiG-23M (ASCC: Flogger-B). By the end of the Cold War the regiment was flying 43 MiG-23MLD. This regiment was under 8th Air Defence Army Soviet Air Defence Forces (8 OA PVO). In 1992 it was taken over by Ukraine. In October 1994 it was renamed 10th Aviation Base, and the base was disbanded in December 1996.
- 260th Heavy Bomber Aviation Regiment (260 TBAP) flying Tupolev Tu-16 (ASCC: Badger) and later 20 Tupolev Tu-22M3 (ASCC: Backfire) aircraft at the end of the Cold War. Under 13th Guards Heavy Bomber Aviation Division, 46th Air Army, and later seemingly 106th Long Range Aviation Group of the Armed Forces of Ukraine.

In 2009 work started on dismantling buildings, warehouses, garages and other property on the aerodrome acted against the community and district government area. Zokrama Striyskoy District Council chairman Roman Kozak said: 'Investors are willing to come even today, is an American company that consents to recover the strip to the airport work, taking planes to refuel'.
