= Chekurovka (air base) =

Military airfield in Sakha Republic, Russia

Chekurovka
- Chekurovku, Chekurovke, Чекуровка
- Tiksi, Sakha in Russia
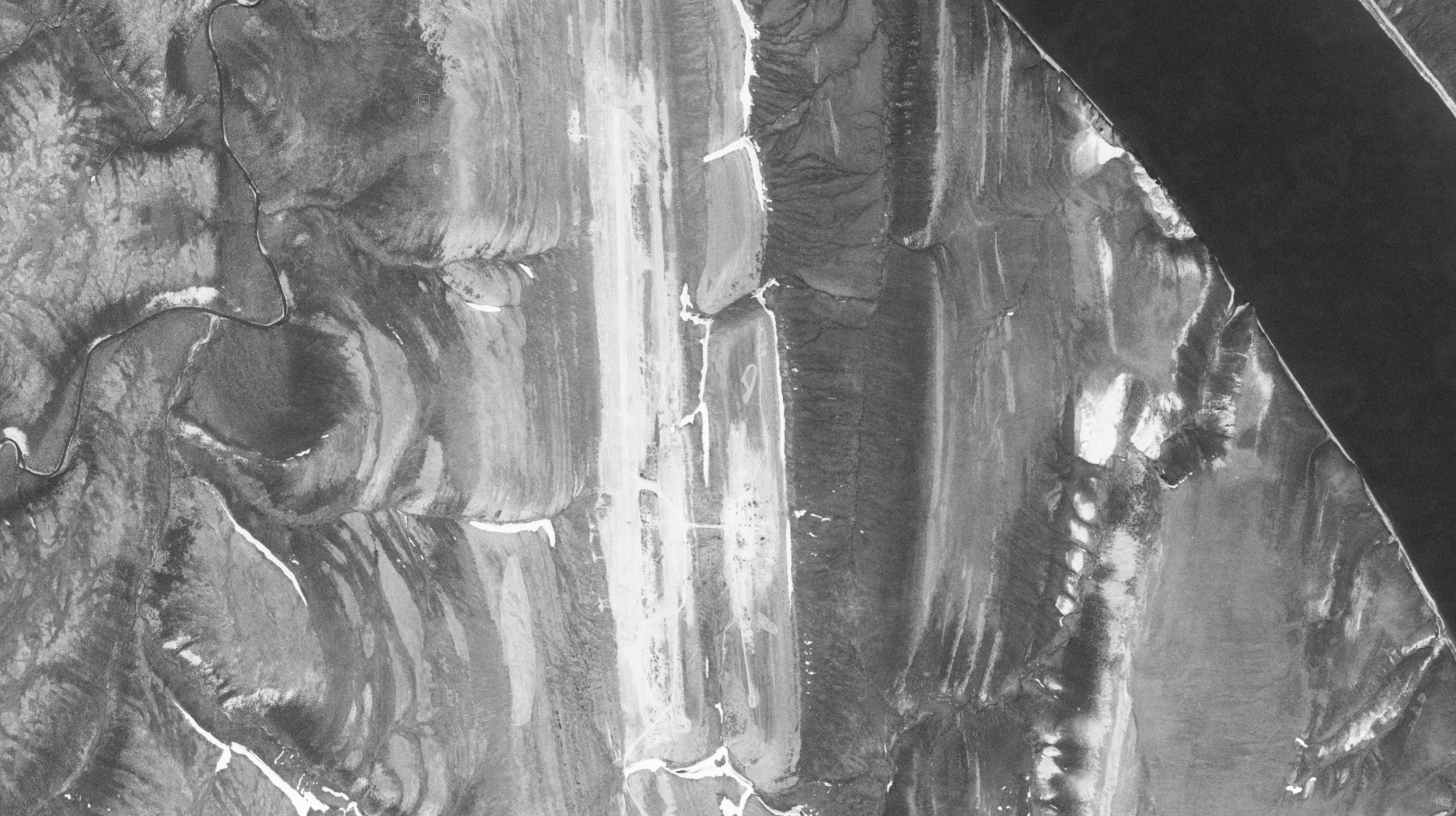
- Chekurovka airfield, June 1968, from KH-7 satellite.

Site information
- Type: Air Base
- Owner: Ministry of Defence
- Operator: Soviet Air Forces

Location
- Shown within Sakha Republic Chekurovka (Russia)
- Coordinates: 71°3′54″N 127°20′18″E

Site history
- Built: 1960
- In use: 1960-1968

Airfield information
- Identifiers: ICAO: ZAR3
- Elevation: 248 metres (814 ft) AMSL
Runways
Direction	Length and surface
01/19	3,500 metres (11,483 ft) Concrete

Chekurovka was an Arctic military airfield in Sakha Republic, Russia located 89 km southwest of Tiksi. It is a remote, large bomber staging base that was either abandoned during construction or commissioned for emergency use. It was probably built around 1960 as a forward deployment base for the Soviet Union's strategic bomber force and abandoned shortly afterward. Its status and condition are unknown.

Reconnaissance imagery showed that two aircraft were observed on the air base in 1968.

== See also ==
- Aspidnoye (air base), abandoned Arctic staging base
- Ostrov Bolshevik (air base), abandoned Arctic staging base
- Tiksi North Air Base, abandoned Arctic staging base
- Tiksi West Airfield, abandoned Arctic staging base
