= Ostrov Bolshevik (air base) =

Military airfield in Krasnoyarsk Krai, Russia

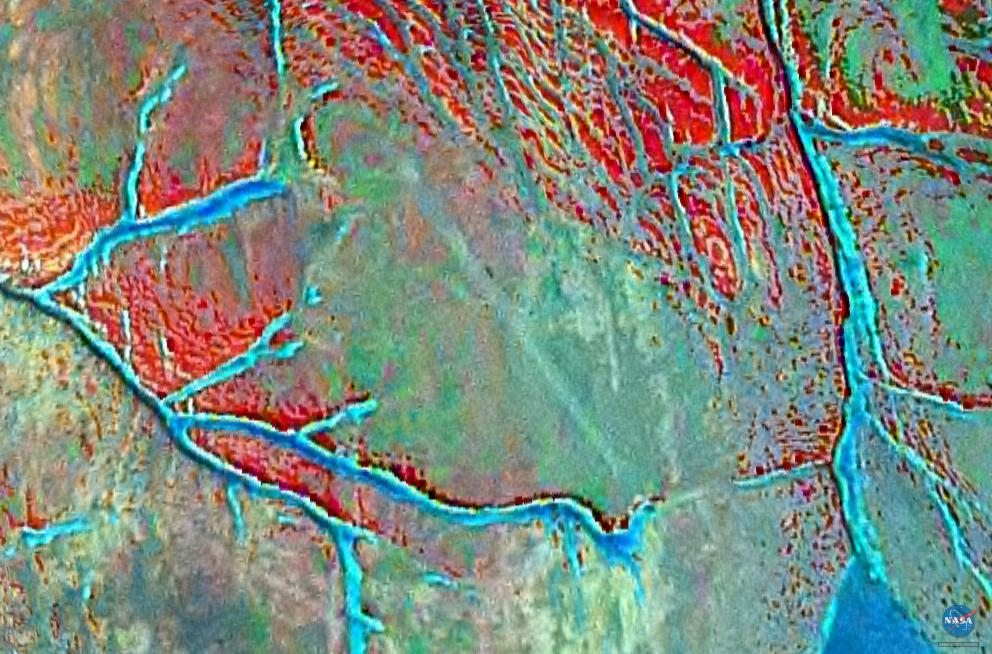
- IATA: none; ICAO: ZC8K

Summary
- Airport type: Military
- Operator: Russian Air Force
- Location: Ostrov Bolshevik
- Elevation AMSL: 965 ft (294 m)
- Coordinates: 78°35′6″N 100°59′42″E

Map
- Location within Russia

Runways
Direction	Length		Surface
Direction	ft	m	Surface
12/30	10,499	3,200

Ostrov Bolshevik (Russian: о́стров Большеви́к, pronounced [ˈostrəf bəlʲʂɨˈvʲik]) is an airfield on Bolshevik Island in Krasnoyarsk Krai, Russia. It is the fourth most northernmost airfield in Russia. It was probably constructed around 1960, and is among several very large trans-polar airfields for Russia's strategic bomber force that were either abandoned during construction or served limited use.

Ostrov Bolshevik was created as one of several winter staging bases for the Soviet Union's Tupolev Tu-95 bomber fleet. At this type of facility, each fall Army engineering teams would grade the airfield and repair runway markings. During the winter the airfield would receive aircraft on its packed snow surface during periods of increased military posture, then the facility would be abandoned in the spring. The facility appears to have been closed in the 1960s or 1970s as Russia's deterrence force shifted from bombers to ICBMs.

== See also ==
- Chekurovka, abandoned Arctic staging base
- Aspidnoye (air base), abandoned Arctic staging base
- Tiksi North, abandoned Arctic staging base
- Tiksi West, abandoned Arctic staging base
