= Tiksi =

Settlement in Sakha Republic, Russia

Tiksi Тикси
- Urban-type settlement

Other transcription(s)
  - Yakut: Тиксии
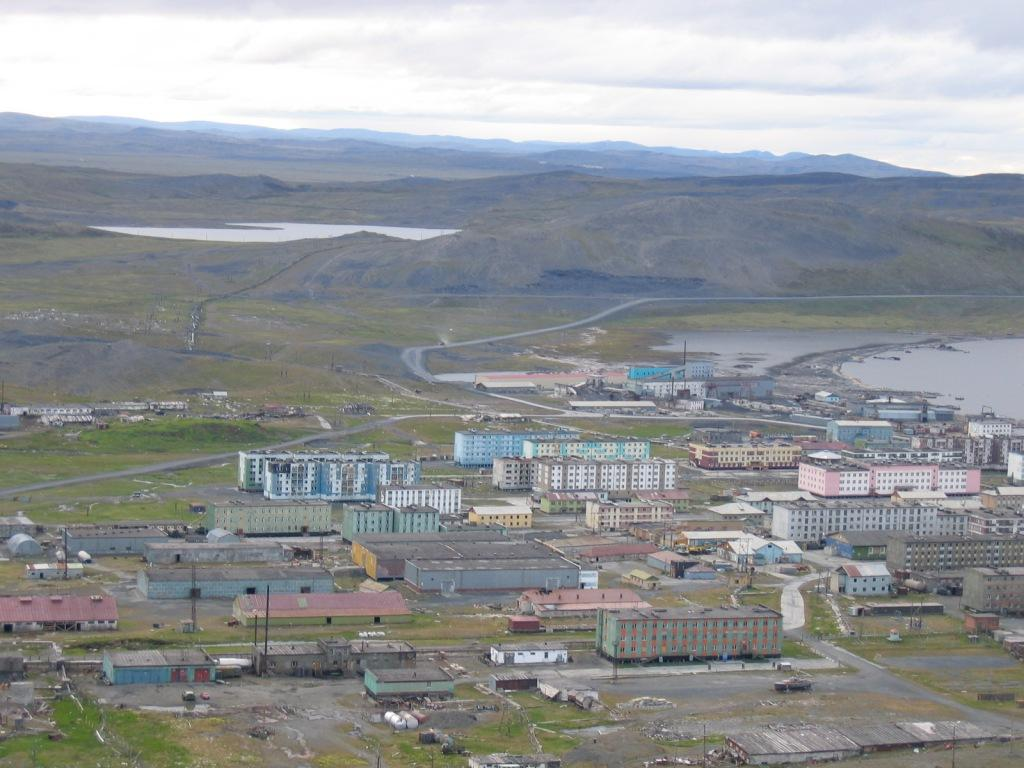
- View of Tiksi
- Interactive map of Tiksi
- Location of Tiksi Tiksi (Sakha Republic)
- Coordinates: 71°39′N 128°52′E
- Country: Russia
- Federal subject: Sakha Republic
- Administrative district: Bulunsky District
- SettlementSelsoviet: Settlement of Tiksi
- Founded: 1933
- Urban-type settlement status since: 1939
- Elevation: 10 m (33 ft)

Population (2010 Census)
  - Total: 5,063
  - Estimate (January 2016): 4,556 (−10%)

Administrative status
  - Capital of: Bulunsky District, Settlement of Tiksi

Municipal status
  - Municipal district: Bulunsky Municipal District
  - Urban settlement: Tiksi Urban Settlement
  - Capital of: Bulunsky Municipal District, Tiksi Urban Settlement
- Time zone: UTC+
- Postal codes: 678400, 678403, 678409
- Dialing code: +7 41167
- OKTMO ID: 98612151051

Tiksi (Russian: Тикси, IPA: [ˈtʲiksʲɪ]; Yakut: Тиксии, Tiksii – lit. a moorage place) is an urban locality (an urban-type settlement) and the administrative center of Bulunsky District in the Sakha Republic, Russia, located on the shore of the Buor-Khaya Gulf of the Laptev Sea, southeast of the delta of the Lena River. As of the 2010 census, its population was 5,063.

Historical population
Year	Pop.	±%
1939	697	—
1959	4,833	+593.4%
1970	8,099	+67.6%
1979	9,505	+17.4%
1989	11,649	+22.6%
2002	5,873	−49.6%
2010	5,063	−13.8%
2021	4,173	−17.6%
Source: Census data

== History ==
In August 1901, Russian Arctic ship Zarya headed across the Laptev Sea, searching for the legendary Sannikov Land but was soon blocked by floating drift ice in the New Siberian Islands. During 1902, the attempts to reach Sannikov Land continued while Zarya was trapped in fast ice.

Leaving the ship, Russian Arctic explorer Baron Eduard Toll and three companions vanished forever in November 1902 while traveling away from Bennett Island towards the south on loose ice floes. Zarya was finally moored close to Brusneva Island in the Tiksi Bay, never to leave the place again. The remaining members of the expedition returned to Saint Petersburg, while Captain Fyodor Matisen went to Yakutsk.

Modern Tiksi was founded in 1933; urban-type settlement status was granted to it in 1939. During the Cold War, Tiksi saw military construction projects at Tiksi North and Tiksi West airfields. Since the dissolution of the Soviet Union, Tiksi's population has declined markedly and many of its apartment blocks have been abandoned. Despite its rapid population decline, it remains the world's most northerly settlement with a population of over 4,000.

== Administrative and municipal status ==
Within the framework of administrative divisions, the urban-type settlement of Tiksi serves as the administrative center of Bulunsky District. As an administrative division, it is incorporated within Bulunsky District as the Settlement of Tiksi. As a municipal division, the Settlement of Tiksi is incorporated within Bulunsky Municipal District as Tiksi Urban Settlement.

== Economy ==
=== Transportation ===
Tiksi serves as one of the principal ports for accessing the Laptev Sea. It is served by the Tiksi Airport, which was shut down by the Defense Ministry on October 1, 2012 except for helicopters. Tiksi was connected only by helicopter flights and winter roads. The closure was harshly criticized by Russian Prime Minister Dmitry Medvedev. Following an agreement between the Defense Ministry and the Government of the Sakha Republic in April 2013, the airfield re-opened to passenger traffic in June 2013. In December 2013, President Vladimir Putin announced that the Tiksi airport would be "rehabilitated" along with others beyond the Arctic Circle.

Since June 2023, the port of Tiksi has been opened to foreign ships.

The Lena River is navigable in the summer months. There is infrequent passenger navigation from Yakutsk.

== Climate ==
Tiksi has a tundra climate (Köppen ET). Winter averages and extremes are less severe than the subarctic region further south, but the winter length is longer courtesy of the higher latitude. The very short summers are generally cooler than inland regions (although in 1991 a temperature as high as +34 °C (93 °F) was reported) and see rainfall on most days. The polar night lasts from November 19 to January 24, and the period with continuous daylight, the midnight sun, lasts a bit longer, from May 11 to August 3.

The growing season in Tiksi lasts for 74 days usually from around June 23 to September 5.

Climate data for Tiksi (1991–2020 normals, extremes 1929–present)
Month	Jan	Feb	Mar	Apr	May	Jun	Jul	Aug	Sep	Oct	Nov	Dec	Year
Record high °C (°F)	−7.6 (18.3)	−5.2 (22.6)	1.6 (34.9)	9.6 (49.3)	23.6 (74.5)	32.8 (91.0)	34.3 (93.7)	29.8 (85.6)	23.0 (73.4)	6.1 (43.0)	−1.2 (29.8)	−4.9 (23.2)	34.3 (93.7)
Mean daily maximum °C (°F)	−25.9 (−14.6)	−26.6 (−15.9)	−21.3 (−6.3)	−12.1 (10.2)	−2.2 (28.0)	8.0 (46.4)	12.7 (54.9)	11.6 (52.9)	4.8 (40.6)	−7.0 (19.4)	−18.7 (−1.7)	−24.7 (−12.5)	−8.4 (16.8)
Daily mean °C (°F)	−29.5 (−21.1)	−30.0 (−22.0)	−25.4 (−13.7)	−16.8 (1.8)	−5.6 (21.9)	3.8 (38.8)	8.3 (46.9)	8.4 (47.1)	2.2 (36.0)	−9.7 (14.5)	−22.0 (−7.6)	−28.1 (−18.6)	−12.0 (10.3)
Mean daily minimum °C (°F)	−33.1 (−27.6)	−33.7 (−28.7)	−29.9 (−21.8)	−22.1 (−7.8)	−9.1 (15.6)	0.6 (33.1)	4.7 (40.5)	5.2 (41.4)	−0.5 (31.1)	−13.1 (8.4)	−25.5 (−13.9)	−31.5 (−24.7)	−15.7 (3.8)
Record low °C (°F)	−48.0 (−54.4)	−50.5 (−58.9)	−47.2 (−53.0)	−46.9 (−52.4)	−32.2 (−26.0)	−15.8 (3.6)	−4.0 (24.8)	−4.0 (24.8)	−18.2 (−0.8)	−35.0 (−31.0)	−43.9 (−47.0)	−48.8 (−55.8)	−50.5 (−58.9)
Average precipitation mm (inches)	22 (0.9)	15 (0.6)	10 (0.4)	8 (0.3)	15 (0.6)	28 (1.1)	45 (1.8)	48 (1.9)	27 (1.1)	15 (0.6)	19 (0.7)	21 (0.8)	273 (10.8)
Average rainy days	0.0	0.0	0.0	0.0	1	12	20	20	9	0.1	0.0	0.0	62.1
Average snowy days	23	21	21	19	20	5	0.2	0.3	10	25	23	23	190.5
Average relative humidity (%)	82	82	83	83	85	82	83	83	82	83	82	81	83
Mean monthly sunshine hours	0.0	40.0	176.9	276.5	199.0	238.2	246.4	132.6	86.8	52.9	4.0	0.0	1,453.3
Source 1: погода и климат
Source 2: (sunshine only)

Coastal temperature data for Tiksi
Month	Jan	Feb	Mar	Apr	May	Jun	Jul	Aug	Sep	Oct	Nov	Dec	Year
Average sea temperature °C (°F)	−1.8 (28.76)	−1.8 (28.76)	−1.8 (28.76)	−1.8 (28.76)	−1.5 (29.3)	.4 (32.72)	3.9 (39.02)	7.6 (45.68)	4.8 (40.64)	0.7 (30.74)	−1.7 (28.94)	−1.8 (28.76)	0.317 (32.57)
