= Tiksi West Airfield =

Former military airfield in Sakha Republic, Russia

Tiksi West
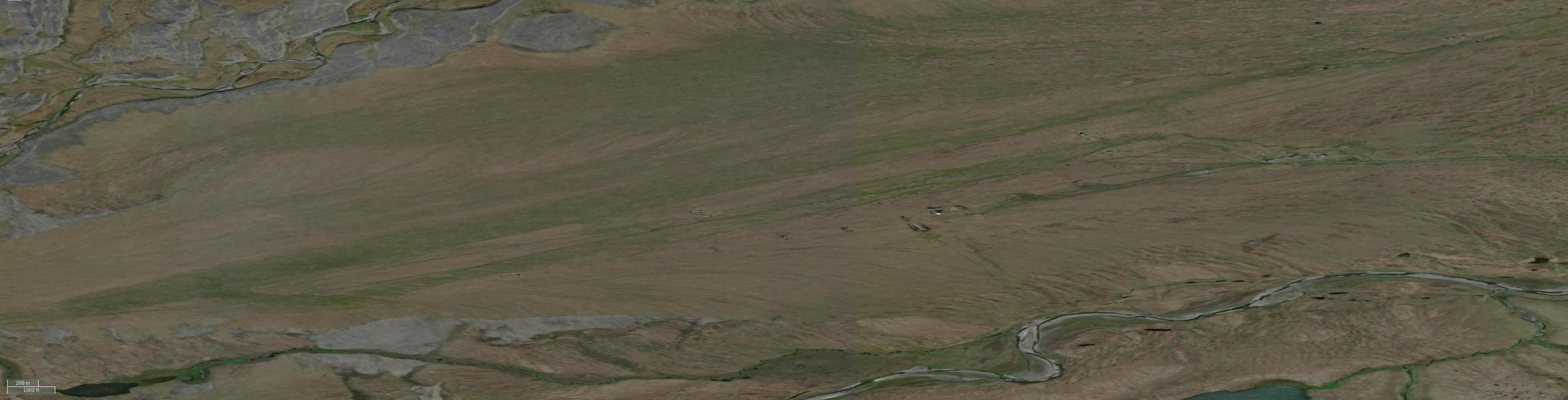
- Satellite imagery of former Tiksi West air base
- IATA: none; ICAO: none

Summary
- Airport type: Military
- Operator: Russian Air Force
- Location: Tiksi
- Elevation AMSL: 195 ft (59 m)
- Coordinates: 71°41′36″N 128°41′0″E

Map
- Shown within Sakha Republic Tiksi West (Russia)

Runways
| Direction | Length | | Surface |
| Direction | ft | m | Surface |
|---|---|---|---|
| | 11,483 | 3,500 |

The Tiksi West complex, captured by a KH-9 HEXAGON satellite in 1974.

Tiksi West (Tiksi-Zapadny) was a large air base in Sakha Republic, Russia, located about 7 km west of Tiksi. It appeared on Department of Defense navigation charts during the Cold War, and was listed as having a 13,500 ft (4100 metre) runway with jet capabilities.

== History ==
The airfield was a large unimproved airstrip operated in the 1960s and 1970s. It was intended for arctic staging by Tupolev Tu-95 strategic bombers based at southerly locations such as Belaya. It also served as a diversion airfield for Tiksi. The airfield was only operational during the wintertime, when the packed snow provided a much larger runway and tarmac area than that available at nearby Tiksi Airport, allowing the airfield to receive many more airplanes. This was critical as the Soviet Union only had a small number of staging bases to reach North America. It was monitored by US intelligence as a possible Tupolev Tu-22M (Backfire) staging base as late as 1980.

Tiksi West was abandoned at the end of the Cold War. However several POL (petroleum, oil, and lubrication) farms fed by pipelines from the port facilities remain plainly visible on satellite imagery.

== See also ==
- Tiksi Airport
- Chekurovka, abandoned Arctic staging base
- Aspidnoye, abandoned Arctic staging base
- Ostrov Bolshevik, abandoned Arctic staging base
- Tiksi North, abandoned Arctic staging base
- List of Soviet Air Force bases
