= Zyabrovka (air base) =

Military airport in Gomel, Belarus

Zyabrovka Pribytki
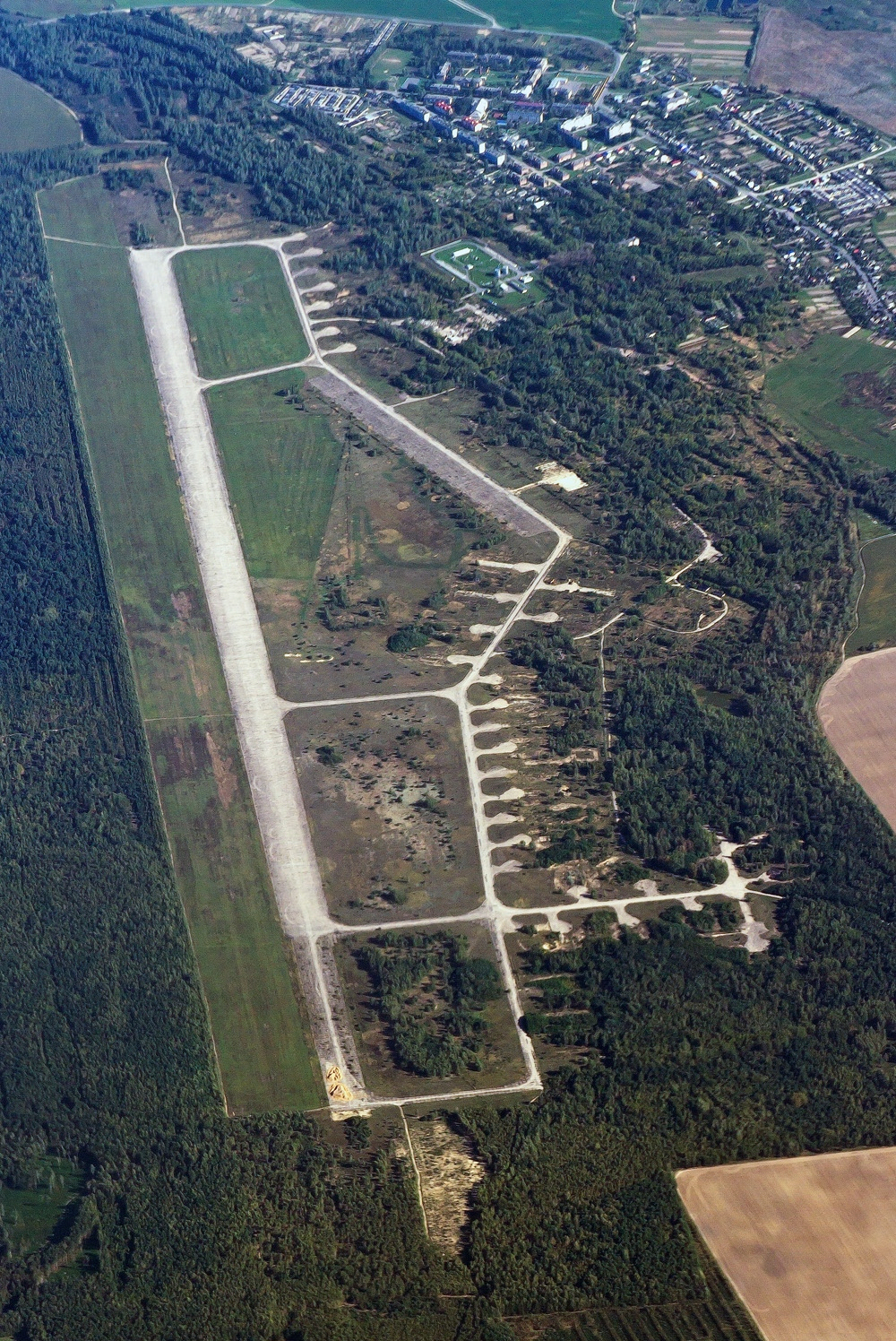
- IATA: none; ICAO: XMGR

Summary
- Airport type: Military
- Location: Gomel
- Elevation AMSL: 456 ft (139 m)
- Coordinates: 52°18′22.0″N 31°9′44.1″E

Map
- Location in Belarus Zyabrovka; Pribytki (Europe)

Runways
| Direction | Length | | Surface |
| Direction | ft | m | Surface |
|---|---|---|---|
| 10/28 | 9,760 | 2,975 | Concrete |

Zyabrovka (also Pribytki) is a military air base located 16 km southeast of Gomel, Gomel Region, Belarus.

From November 1951 to July 1957 the 50th Air Army of Long-Range Aviation included the 144th Fighter Aviation Division with its headquarters at Mogilev, Mogilev Oblast, Belorussian SSR. The division's 439th Fighter Aviation Regiment was flying MiG-15s and MiG-17s during that period from Zyabrovka. The regiment disbanded on 1 April 1958.

By the early 1960s Tupolev Tu-16R aircraft were flying from the base. The airfield was renovated in 1963. It received the Tu-22R around 1966, and by 1967 had 24 based there. Pribytki was one of nine major operating locations for the Tupolev Tu-22 Blinder in the mid-1960s. The reconnaissance aircraft were tasked with operations in the Baltic and northern Europe. From 1973 into the 1980s pilots from Libya and Iraq trained in the Tu-22 here. The Tu-22 units were disbanded in 1994 and the aircraft sent to Engels-2 for disposal.

Pribytki was home to 290 Gv ODRAP (290th Guards Long Range Reconnaissance Aviation Regiment) flying Tu-16R from the early 1960s to 1994 and the Tu-22RDM from the 1960s to 1994; plus a number of Tu-22R aircraft. From 1960 to 1980 the regiment was part of the 6th Heavy Bomber Aviation Corps, and from 1980 to 1994, the 46th Air Army. (Holm)

During the 2022 Russian invasion of Ukraine the Russian military deployed attack helicopters here.
