= Tiksi North Air Base =

Former military airfield in Sakha Republic, Russia

Tiksi North
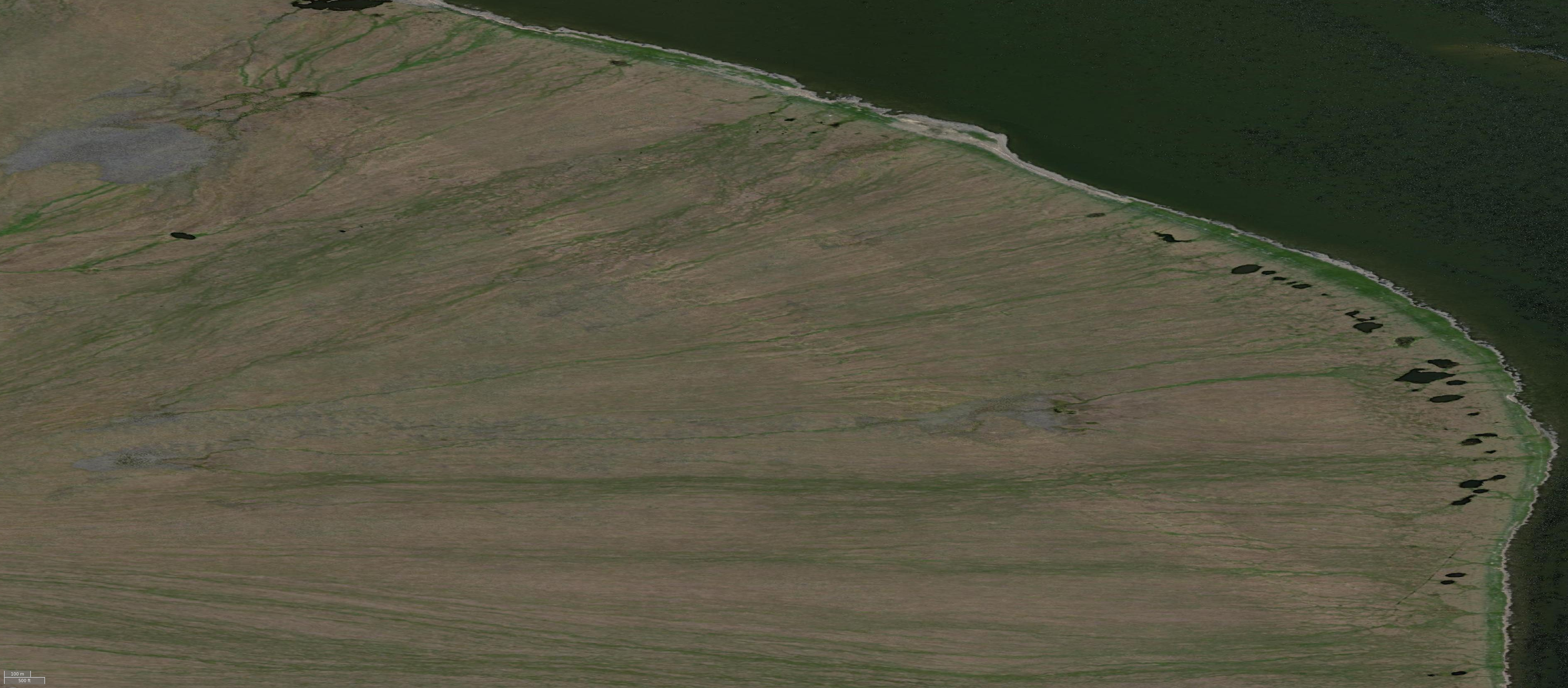
- Satellite imagery of former Tiksi North air base
- IATA: none; ICAO: ZC8L

Summary
- Airport type: Military
- Operator: Russian Air Force
- Location: Tiksi
- Elevation AMSL: 66 ft / 20 m
- Coordinates: 72°2′18″N 128°28′18″E

Map
- Shown within Sakha Republic Tiksi North (Russia)

Runways
Direction	Length		Surface
Direction	ft	m	Surface
17/35	11,483	3,500

Tiksi North is a former Russian military airfield located 41 km north of Tiksi in Bulunsky District, Sakha Republic. Described as a ghost airfield, its probable use was either as a diversion or dispersal airfield for Soviet bombers. It was likely abandoned sometime in the early 1960s.

== See also ==
- Tiksi Airport

Other abandoned arctic staging bases:

- Chekurovka
- Dresba
- Ostrov Bolshevik
- Tiksi West
