= Aspidnoye (air base) =

Aspidnoye дресба
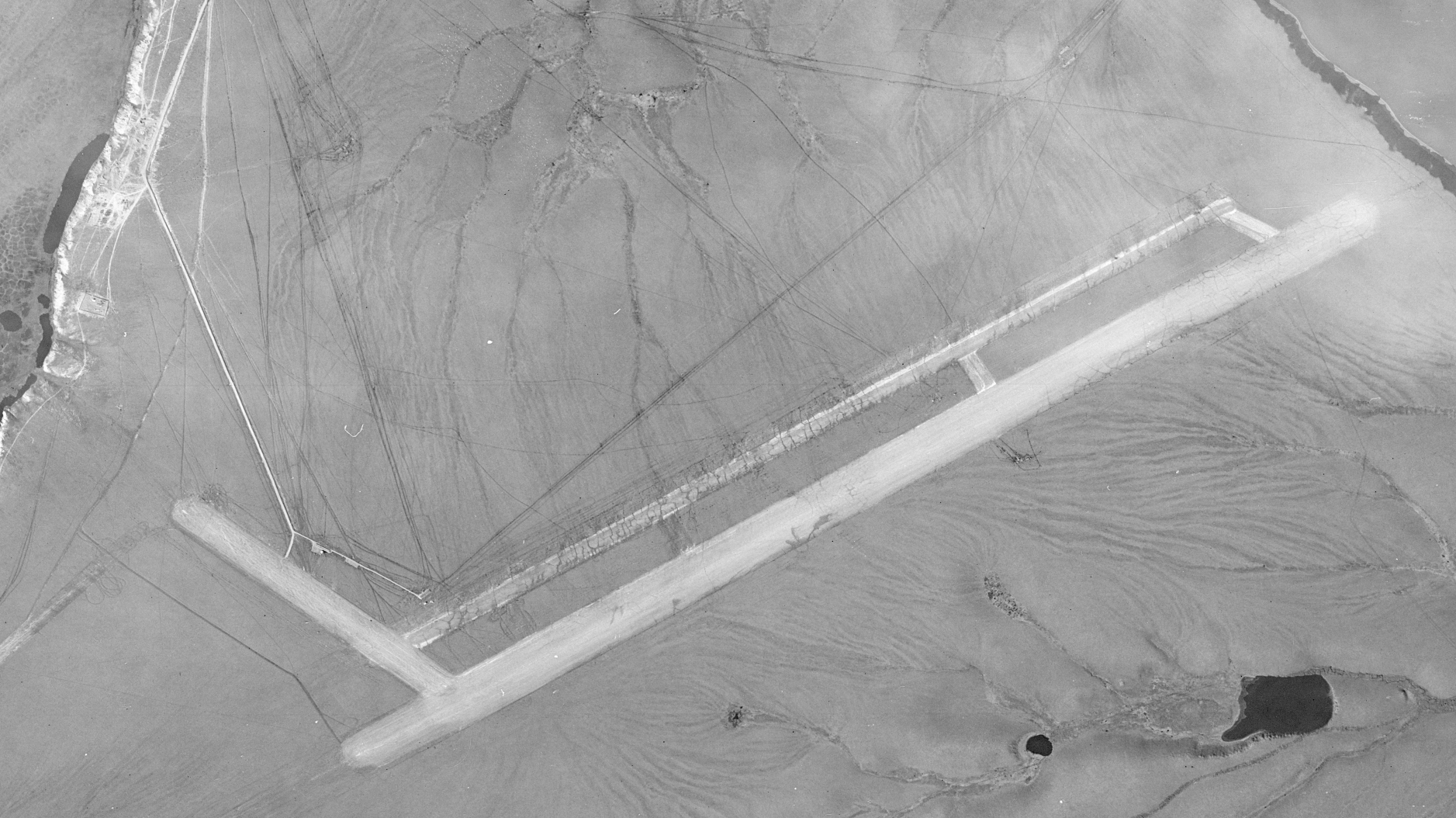
- Aspidnoye, August 1966, from US KH-7 satellite.
- IATA: none; ICAO: ZA2V

Summary
- Airport type: Military
- Operator: Russian Air Force
- Location: Ambarchik
- Elevation AMSL: 272 ft / 83 m
- Coordinates: 69°21′48″N 161°33′42″E

Map
- Location within Russia

Runways
Direction	Length		Surface
Direction	ft	m	Surface
17/35	11,483	3,500	Concrete

Aspidnoye, also referred to as Dresba and Krumaya, is an abandoned Russian military airfield near Ambarchik in Nizhnekolymsky District, Sakha Republic, near the border of the Chukotka Autonomous Okrug, located 41 km north of Petushki and near the now also abandoned settlement of Mikhalkino.

== History ==
The airfield was constructed around 1960 and was initially classified by the CIA as a long range bomber base, though it was never completed. US KH-4 reconnaissance satellite passes in 1963 showed no aircraft activity at the base but indicated an exceptionally long 15,000 ft (4600 m) runway. However this runway was made of graded earth and analysts determined the airfield was probably not usable during the summertime due to mud and drainage across the surfaces. The airfield was likely intended as a winter season arctic staging base, as the open tundra and packed snow would allow for large numbers of bomber aircraft to be serviced with minimal infrastructure. The base would then be abandoned each spring.

The airfield was intended for staging and dispersal for the Soviet Union's Tupolev Tu-95 and Tupolev Tu-22 bomber force. The position of Aspidnoye on the shore of the Arctic Ocean would have given it access to northern resupply ship routes for fuel supplies. Soviet SEVER tropospheric scatter radio relay network facility Mikhalkino, callsign Khrustal on the TRRL-103 Vorkuta to Anadyr relay line (possibly with radar equipment, such as a P-14 Tall King unit), exists on satellite imagery 14 km northwest of the airfield at 69.464272°N 161.374766°E.

The last reference in declassified CIA documents to Aspidnoye was in 1973 when it appeared in a target list. It was listed as non-operational and covered by snow.

== See also ==
Other abandoned arctic staging bases:

- Chekurovka
- Ostrov Bolshevik
- Tiksi North
- Tiksi West
