= KS-1 Komet =

Air-to-surface, anti-ship missile

KS-1 Komet/AS-1 'Kennel'
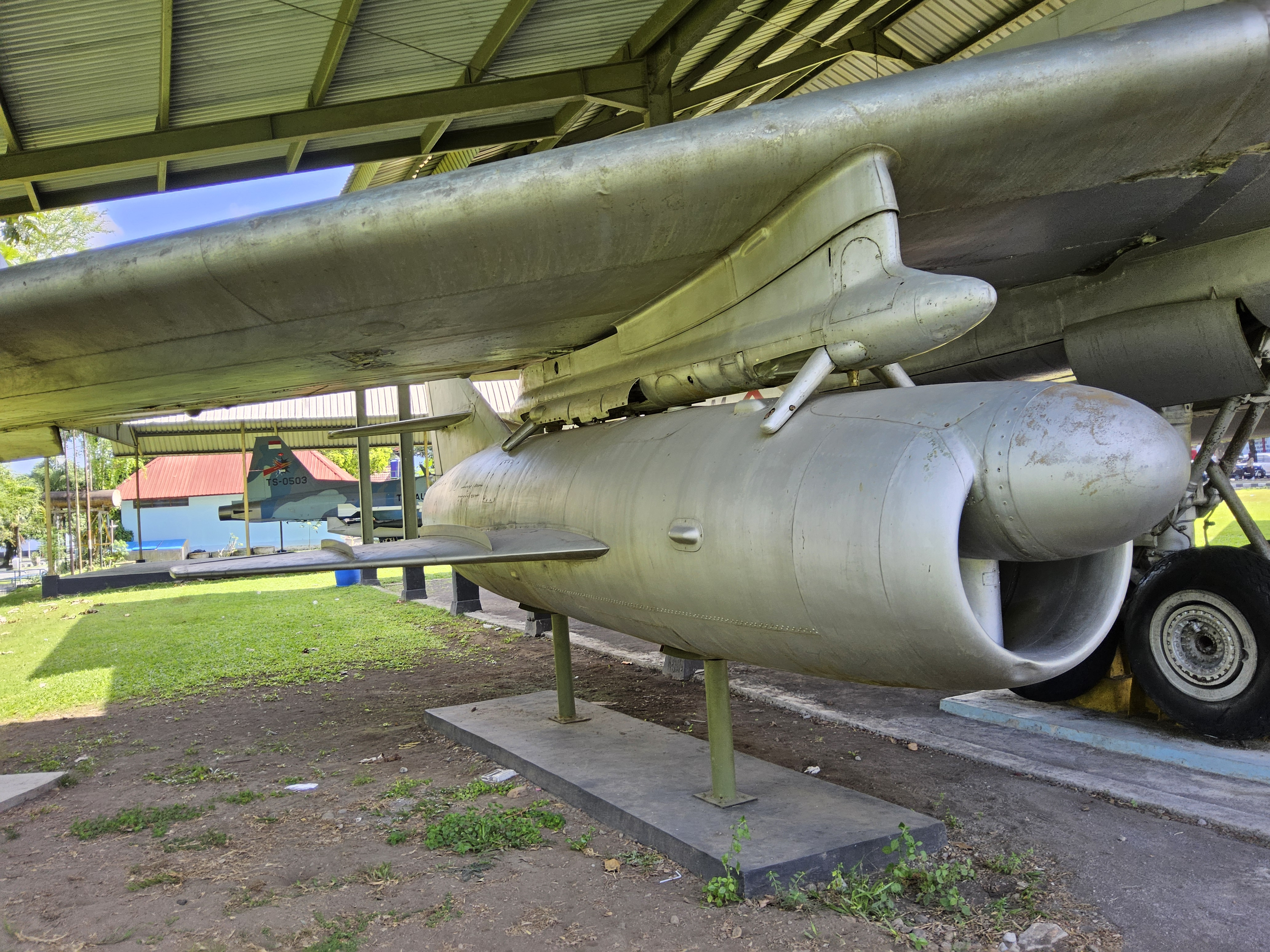
- KS-1 Komet mounted under the wing pylon of a Tu-16 at the Dirgantara Mandala Museum.
- Type: Air-to-surface missile Anti-ship missile
- Place of origin: Soviet Union

Service history
- In service: 1953–1969 (Soviet Union)

Production history
- Manufacturer: MKB Raduga

Specifications
- Mass: 3,000 kg (6,600 lb)
- Length: 8.29 m (27 ft 2 in)
- Diameter: 1.20 m (3 ft 11 in)
- Wingspan: 4.77 m (15 ft 8 in)
- Warhead: 600 kg (1,300 lb) High Explosive
- Engine: RD-500K turbojet
- Operational range: 90 km (56 mi) up to 100 km
- Maximum speed: Mach 0.9
- Guidance system: initial - inertial guidance, terminal - active radar homing
- Launch platform: Tupolev Tu-16 'Badger'; Tupolev Tu-4 (K variant only)

The Raduga KS-1 Comet (Russian: КС-1 "Комета" (Крылатый Снаряд: winged projectile), NATO reporting name: AS-1 Kennel) was a Soviet short range air-to-surface missile, primarily developed for anti-ship missions. It was carried on two aircraft, the Tupolev Tu-4 and the Tupolev Tu-16.

== Development ==
Development began in 1947 along with a related ground-launched missile, the SSC-2B "Samlet" (S-2 Sopka), both missiles using aerodynamics derived from the Mikoyan-Gurevich MiG-15 fighter aircraft, and developed under the anti-ship missile codename "Komet".

The KS-1 was designed for use against surface ships. It resembled a scaled-down MiG-15 with the cockpit and undercarriage removed. Its main fuselage was cigar-shaped with swept wings and an aircraft type tail. It was propelled by a Klimov RD-500K turbojet engine, reverse-engineered from the Rolls-Royce Derwent. Guidance was provided by an inertial navigation system (INS) in the midcourse phase, and by a semi-active radar in the terminal phase which directed the missile to its target. A 600 kg high explosive (HE) armour-piercing warhead was carried.

The AS-1 is believed to have entered service in 1955, initially being deployed on the Tu-4 and later on the Tu-16KS 'Badger-B' strategic bomber, on two under-wing pylons. The missile was also exported to Egypt and Indonesia.

Sources indicate that most of the AS-1 "Kennel" missiles were replaced by the AS-5 'Kelt' (KSR-2/Kh-11), which was first deployed in 1966. The last KS-1s were withdrawn from service in 1969.

== Operators ==
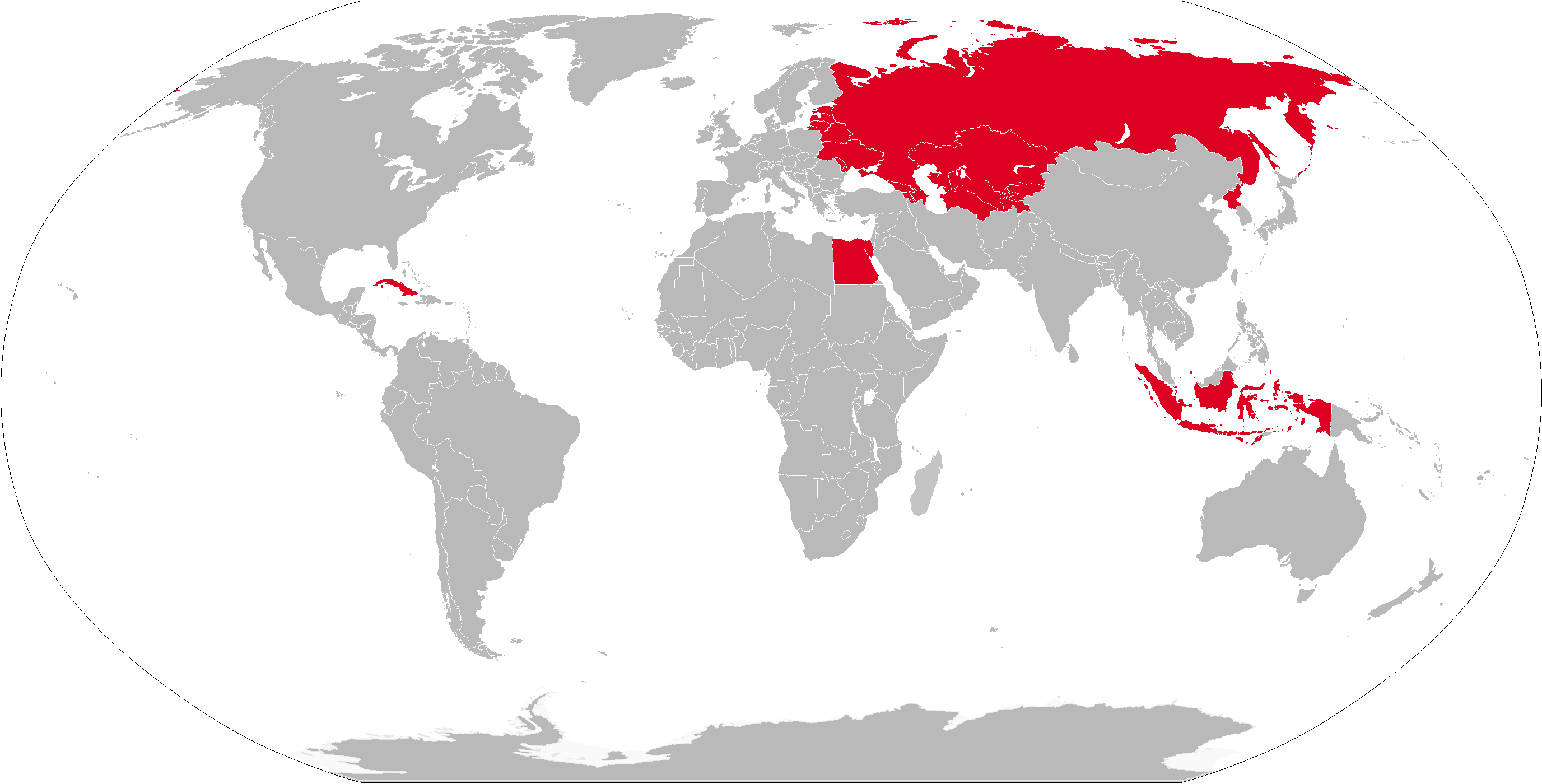
Map with former KS-1 operators in red

=== Former operators ===
Cuba

- Cuban Navy (S-2 Sopka version)

Egypt

- Egyptian Air Force

Indonesia

- Indonesian Air Force

Soviet Union

- Long Range Aviation, Soviet Air Forces

116th Heavy Bomber Aviation Division

North Korea

== Land based variants ==
=== Sopka ===
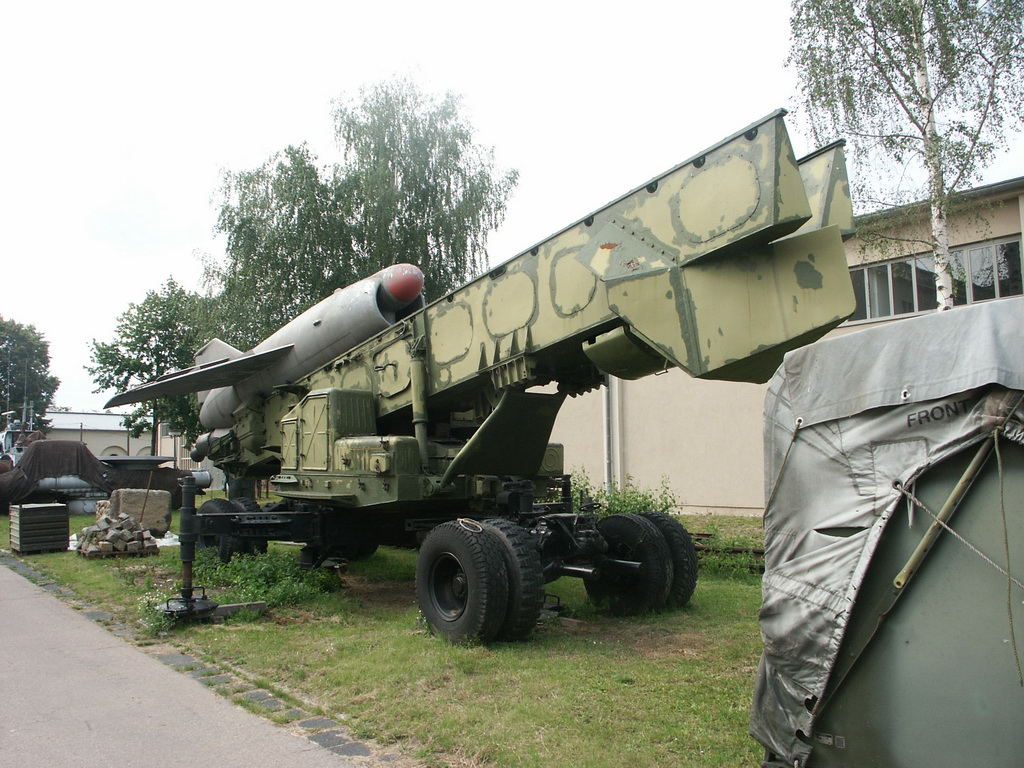
Sopka land-based launcher variant

The S-2 Sopka coastal defense system (Russian GRAU code 4K87) (NATO code: SSC-2b Samlet) was a conventionally armed variant which attached a SPRD-15 jet assisted rocket to launch the missile from fixed launchers. After attaining sufficient velocity, the AS-1 turbojet would carry the missile to the target. The system was designed for land based attacks on sea targets and widely deployed in eastern bloc countries such as Poland and East Germany during the Cold War. One Sopka regiment was stationed in Cuba as part of Operation Anadyr. The Samlet was deployed to Alexandria and fired at Israeli ships during the Yom Kippur War. The Samlets saw long service despite their obsolescence and were finally retired from the Soviet arsenal in 1980.

=== FKR-1 ===
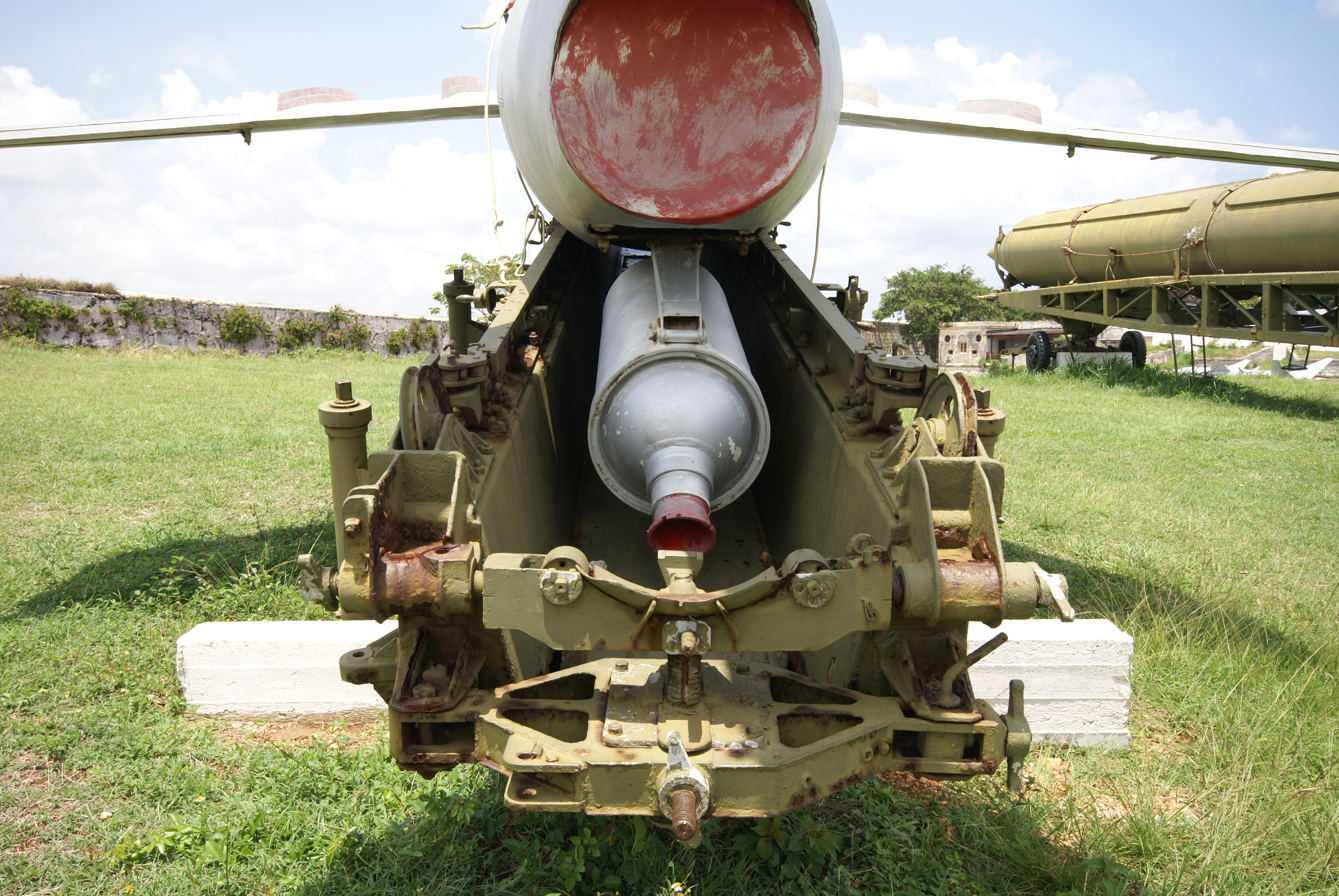
Rear view of an FKR-1 with SPRD-15 rocket engine

The Frontline Combat Rocket (Russian: фронтовая крылатая ракета, Soviet pact nickname: Meteor) (NATO code: SSC-2a Salish) was a nuclear capable mobile launching system designed for ground combat. With a 12 kiloton warhead and 180 km range it entered the equipment of Soviet and GDR forces in 1957.

It carried nuclear warheads with yields from 5 to 14 kilotons. Like the Sopka, cruising speed was achieved with a strap on SPRD-15 rocket, but the FKR system allowed launch directly from the transporter, and the missile was modified to accept tactical nuclear warheads. Its range was 150 kilometers. Unknown to the US military during the Cuban Missile Crisis, two FKR regiments (the 561st and 584th) armed with 80 fourteen kiloton warheads were positioned in Cuba — one to attack the American base at Guantanamo with the second positioned near Havana to destroy any units attempting landings. Although some authorities dispute whether local commanders had authority to use these theater nuclear weapons, the weapons were present and it is argued that if pressured, Soviet soldiers might have used them.

== See also ==
- SAAB Rb 08
- KSShch
- P-20 Sokol
