= KSR-5 =

Soviet cruise and anti-ship missile

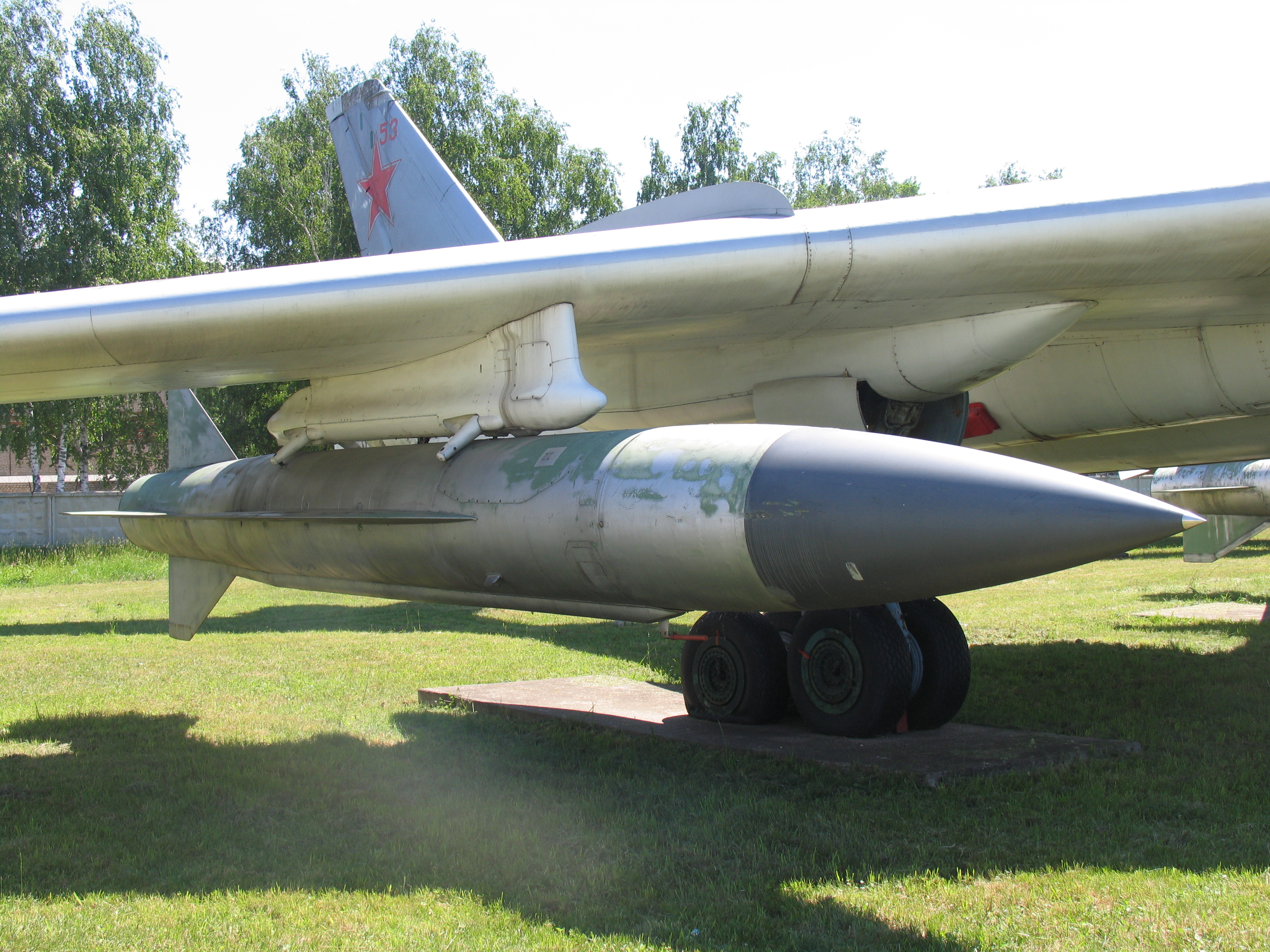
- Tu-16 with KSR-5 under wing
- Type: Air-to-surface missile
- Place of origin: Soviet Union

Service history
- In service: 1969−1994
- Used by: See operators

Production history
- Designer: Tupolev and Mikoyan Missile Design Bureau
- No. built: 300
- Variants: See variants

Specifications
- Mass: 4,500 kg (9,900 lb)
- Length: 10.56 m (34.6 ft)
- Diameter: 920 mm (36 in)
- Wingspan: 2.5 m (8 ft 2 in)
- Maximum firing range: 400 km (250 mi)
- Warhead: High-explosive, HE semi-armour-piercing, nuclear
- Warhead weight: 930–1,000 kg (2,050–2,200 lb)
- Blast yield: 350 kT (Nuclear)
- Propellant: Solid
- Maximum speed: Mach 2 or Mach 3
- Guidance system: Inertial with active or passive radar
- Launch platform: Tu-16, Tu-22M, Tu-95M

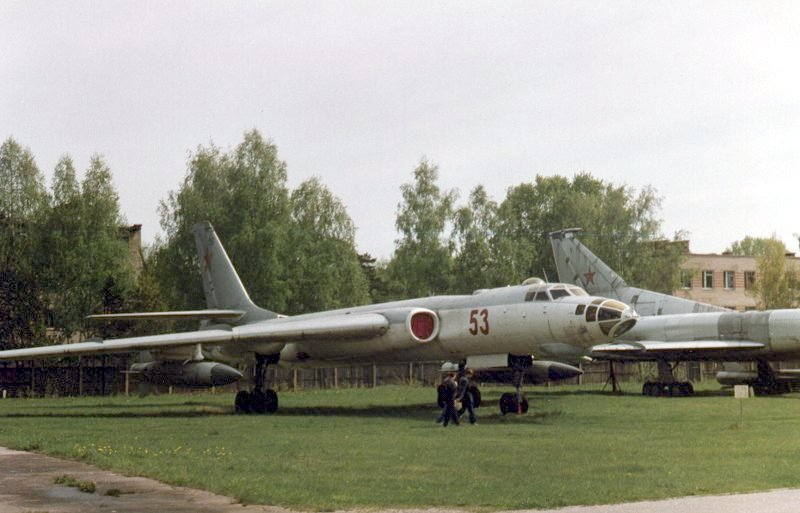
Tu-16K with a missile under each wing

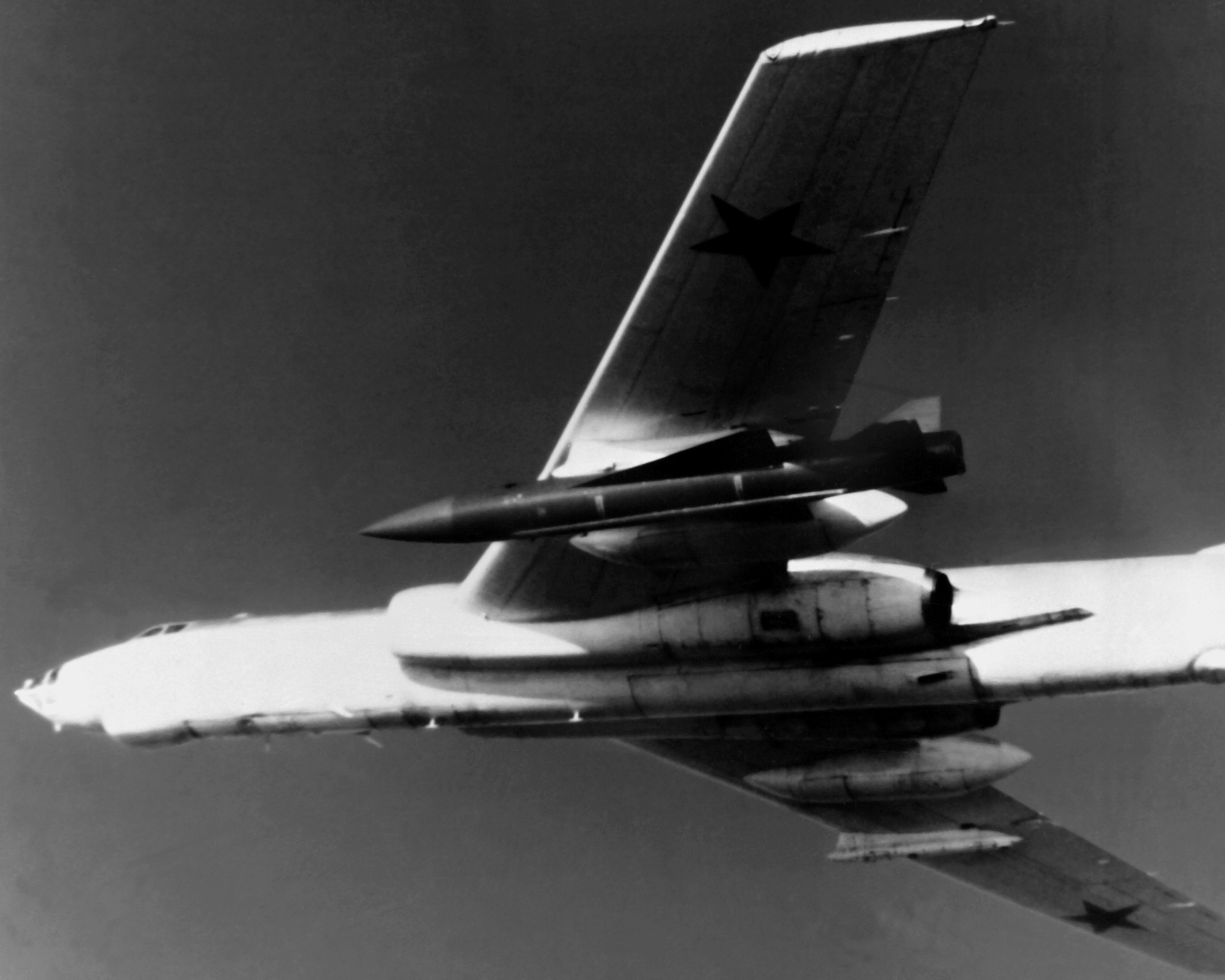
Tu-16 'Badger-G' with KSR-5 under port wing

The KSR-5, also designated as the Kh-26 (NATO reporting name AS-6 Kingfish) was a long-range, air-launched cruise missile and anti-ship missile developed by the Soviet Union. It was essentially a scaled down version of the Kh-22 'Kitchen', primarily carried by the Tupolev Tu-16 bomber.

== Background ==
In the early 1960s the development of new nuclear-capable strategic bombers came into a virtual halt in the Soviet Union, with the focus being shifted on nuclear ballistic missiles and developing cruise missiles for existing aircraft. Developments in jet fighters and surface-to-air missiles during the 1950s made the use of nuclear free-fall bombs impractical against densely protected targets while missiles gave bombers the possibility of striking targets beyond the range of enemy anti-aircraft weapons.

== Description ==
Developed in the late 1960s, the KRS-5 (also designated as the Kh-26) is an improved version of the Kh-22 missile, designed to be smaller, lighter and with a smaller radar signature. According to Janes, it was designed jointly by the Tupolev and Mikoyan Design Bureaus. It was developed as a conventional anti-ship missile and a nuclear cruise missile capable of striking ground targets. Originally designed to be carried on the Tu-22 "Blinder", it was primarily mounted on the Tu-16 "Badger", but it could also be mounted on Tu-22M "Backfire" and Tu-95M "Bear" aircraft as well.

The missile had a maximum range of 400 km (250 mi) and cruise speed of Mach 3 when released from high altitude and 250 km (160 mi) range and cruise speed of Mach 2 when launched at low altitude.

== Variants ==
- Kh-26 − Nuclear variant with inertial guidance. Armed with a 350 kiloton warhead weighing about 1,000 kg (2,200 lb).
- Kh-26N − Active radar homing anti-ship variant, it could carry either a nuclear warhead or a conventional 930 kg (2,050 lb) HE SAP warhead. The seeker had a lock-on range of 25–30 km (16–19 mi).
- Kh-26MP − Anti-radiation variant with a passive radar seeker and a HE blast/fragmentation warhead for use against land-based or ship-mounted radars.
- KSR-5NM and KSR-5MV − Russian air-launched target variants designed by MKB Raduga. They were offered for export in 1993.

== Operational history ==
The KSR-5 entered service in 1969, with later versions designed to be carried in the Tu-95 and Tu-95M being introduced in 1973 and 1976 respectively. In June 1991, it was estimated that the Soviet Union had 300 missiles carried on Badger-G bombers.

Following the dissolution of the Soviet Union, the remaining missiles were used by Russia and possibly Ukraine until 1994. With the retirement of the Tu-16, the nuclear versions of the KSR-2 and KSR-5 missiles were retired by 1993. In 1991, it was estimated Russia had about 100 missiles in its inventory, but most were converted into supersonic targets.

== Operators ==
- Russia − Most were converted for missile target practice
- Soviet Union − Passed on to successor states
- Ukraine

== Bibliography ==
- Bukharin, Oleg; Kadyshev, Timur; Miasnikov, Eugene; Podig, Pavel; Sutyagin, Igor; Tarasenko, Maxim; Zhelezov, Boris (2004). Russian Strategic Nuclear Forces. London: MIT Press. ISBN 978-0-262-66181-2.
- Lennox, Duncan, ed. (2003). Jane's Strategic Weapons Systems (38th ed.). Surrey: Jane's Information Group. ISBN 978-0-7106-0880-2.
- Moore, Mike, ed. (July–August 1993). "Nuclear Notebook". Bulletin of the Atomic Scientists. 49 (6). Chicago, IL: Educational Foundation for Nuclear Science: 56–57. ISSN 0096-3402.
- Taylor, John W. R. (June 1991). "Gallery of Soviet Missiles". Air Force Magazine. 74 (6). Arlington, VA: Air Force Association.: 70–74. ISSN 0730-6784.
