= K-10S =

Early Soviet anti-ship missile

Raduga K-10S/AS-2 Kipper
- Type: anti-ship missile
- Place of origin: Soviet Union

Service history
- In service: 1961-1994
- Wars: Cold War

Production history
- Designer: MKB Raduga
- Designed: 1955
- Produced: 1961
- Variants: P-40

Specifications
- Mass: 4,533 kg (9,994 lb)
- Length: 9.75 m (384 in)
- Diameter: 1 m (39 in)
- Wingspan: 4.18 m (165 in)
- Warhead: FK-10 HE or nuclear
- Warhead weight: 1,000 kg (2,200 lb)
- Detonation mechanism: impact fuze
- Blast yield: 350 kilotons of TNT (1,460TJ)
- Engine: Lyulka AL-5, Tumansky RD-9FK (Mikulin M-9FK),
- Operational range: 260–350 km (160–220 mi; 140–190 nmi)
- Flight ceiling: 12 km (39,000 ft)
- Maximum speed: Mach 1.7 at service ceiling, Mach 1.2 at low altitude
- Guidance system: inertial with terminal active radar homing
- Accuracy: CEP 150 ft (46 m)
- Launch platform: Tu-16K-10 Badger C

The Raduga K-10S (NATO reporting name: AS-2 Kipper) was a Soviet supersonic anti-ship missile that was usually nuclear-armed, designed by MKB Raduga. Its development began in 1955, and it entered service with the Soviet armed forces in 1961. The Kipper missile was a very large one, approximately the size of a small jet fighter, because of the rather primitive state of anti-ship missile technology in the 1950s and 1960s. This missile was never used in combat anywhere.

The AS-2's dedicated launch platform, the Tu-16K-10 Badger C, could carry a single AS-2, semi-recessed in the bomb bay. The Kipper's long range enabled it to be launched, hypothetically, from beyond the range of any shipboard surface-to-air missiles or anti-aircraft guns of that time. The only defense against the Kipper was naval jet fighter aircraft, operating from either an aircraft carrier or a shore airfield.

In flight tests, the Kipper cruised on its approach to a target at an altitude of about 10,000 meters, using inertial guidance until it reaches a range of about 100 to 110 kilometers from the target, where it enters a shallow 15 degree dive, commanded by a mid-course update via radio link. When it reaches a range of 60 to 70 kilometers it levels out at an altitude of between 800 and 1,000 meters where it cruises until it reaches a range of 10 to 16 kilometers, when the missile's active radar homing guidance is engaged. It then enters a dive, striking the target vessel close to or below the waterline.
