= KSR-2 =

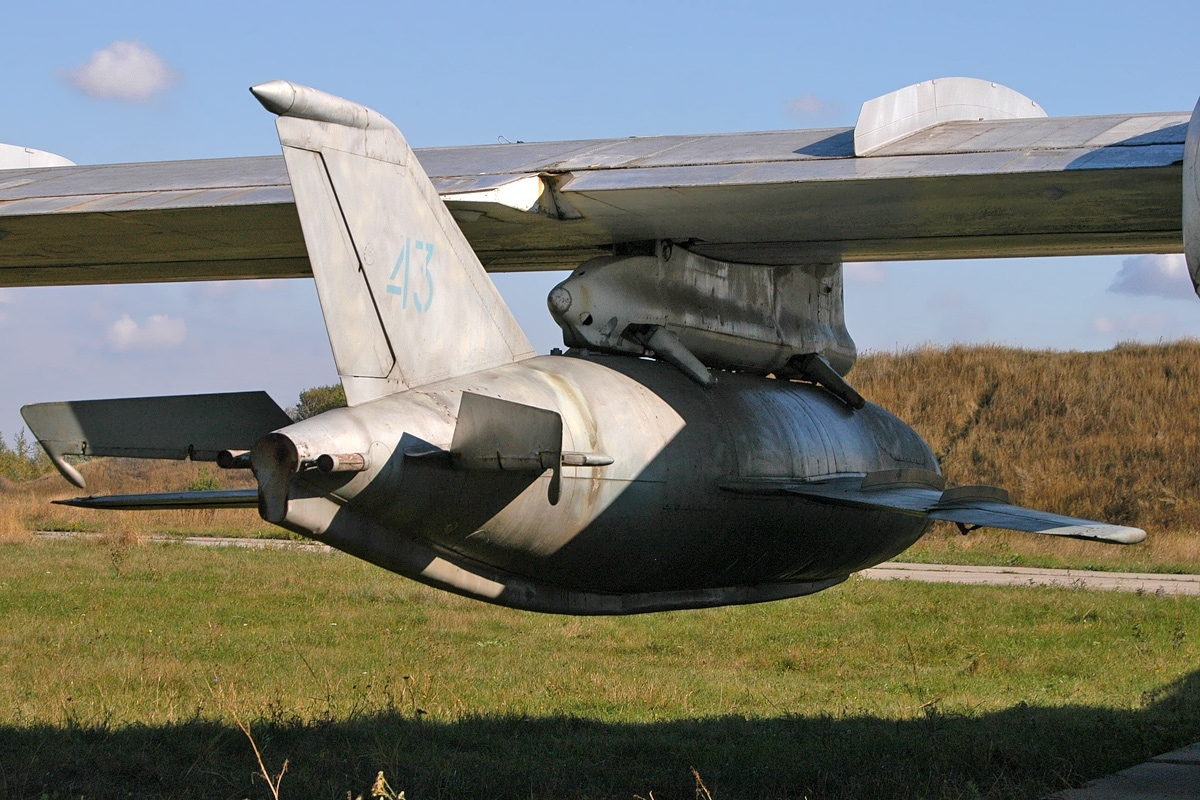
- Type: Air-launched cruise missile
- Place of origin: Soviet Union

Service history
- In service: 1962 to 1990 (approx)
- Used by: Soviet Union, Egypt, Iraq
- Wars: Yom Kippur War, Iran–Iraq War

Production history
- Designed: 1958
- Manufacturer: MKB Raduga
- No. built: 1,000 +
- Variants: KSR-11 anti-radiation missile KRM-2 (MV-1) target drone

Specifications (KSR-2)
- Mass: 4,077 kg
- Length: 8.647 m
- Width: 4.522 m (wingspan)
- Diameter: 1.0 m
- Warhead: High-explosive or nuclear
- Warhead weight: 1000 kg
- Blast yield: 1 Megaton (nuclear)
- Engine: S2.721V two mode rocket motor 1,200 kgp / 700 gbp
- Operational range: 200 km
- Maximum speed: 1,250 km/h
- Guidance system: Inertial guidance followed by terminal active radar homing

The Raduga KSR-2 (NATO reporting name: AS-5 "Kelt") was a Soviet cruise missile developed to replace the KS-1 Komet (NATO: AS-1 "Kennel"). It was developed in 1958 and entered service in 1962. The missile was normally armed with a conventional high-explosive warhead, although it could be fitted with a one-megaton nuclear warhead.

== Development ==
Flight testing of the missile as part of the K-16 weapon system in 1958, with two missiles being carried on BD-352 pylons under the wings of a modified Tu-16 bomber designated as Tu-16KSR-2. The bomber was fitted with a newly developed Roobin-1K (Ruby) search and target illumination radar which has a maximum range of approximately 200 kilometers. During the tests, missiles were fired at ships and ground targets.

== Description ==
The missile itself, like the earlier KS-1, is extremely large, nearly nine meters in length with a wingspan of approximately four and a half meters and weighing 4,000 kilograms. It has swept wings with two wing fences on each wing.

The K-16 system was accepted into Soviet Navy service in 1962. Egypt purchased a number of the K-16 systems. An updated version of the missile entered service in 1967 designated the KSR-2M. It borrowed some features from the KSR-5 missile (NATO:AS-6 "Kingfish") including a new Isayev S5.6.0000 rocket motor. This allowed the new missile to be launched from altitudes as low as 500 meters rather than the previous 1,500 meters.

The missile was prepared for launch by the navigator; the degree of automation provided by the Roobin-1K eliminated the need for a separate radar operator. For propulsion it used a liquid-fueled twin-chamber rocket motor that delivered 1,200 kgf (12 kN; 2,600 lbf) in boost mode and 700 kgf (6.9 kN; 1,500 lbf) in cruise mode. The fuel consisted of the TG-02 (sometimes TT-S2) fuel and AK-20F oxidizer which were toxic and highly corrosive, which made ground handling of the missile difficult.

Once the launching aircraft's radar has locked onto a target, the missile can be launched. The rocket motor fires immediately after release in boost mode, accelerating the missile to its cruise speed. Once the missile turns on an approach course to the target, the motor switches to cruise mode, shutting down one of its chambers. The missile's autopilot then flies a course using inertial guidance toward the target. In anti-shipping mode the missile engages its J-band active radar in the final approach to the target.

== Variants ==
An anti-radar variant of the missile designated KSR-11 was also produced, being externally almost identical to the KSR-2. The KSR-11 was intended to home in on and destroy air-defence radar and ECM facilities. The missile used a 2PRG-11 passive radar seeker.

A target drone version of the missile designated KRM-2 (MV-1) also entered service in 1966, with a different rocket motor, a range of 376 kilometers and a level flight endurance of 433 seconds.

== Combat history ==
Egyptian Tu-16 bombers reportedly launched 13 KSR-2 and 12 KSR-11 missiles during the 1973 Yom Kippur War. One of the Kelt missiles launched at Tel Aviv from Tu-16 was shot down by an IAF jet.

== Operators ==
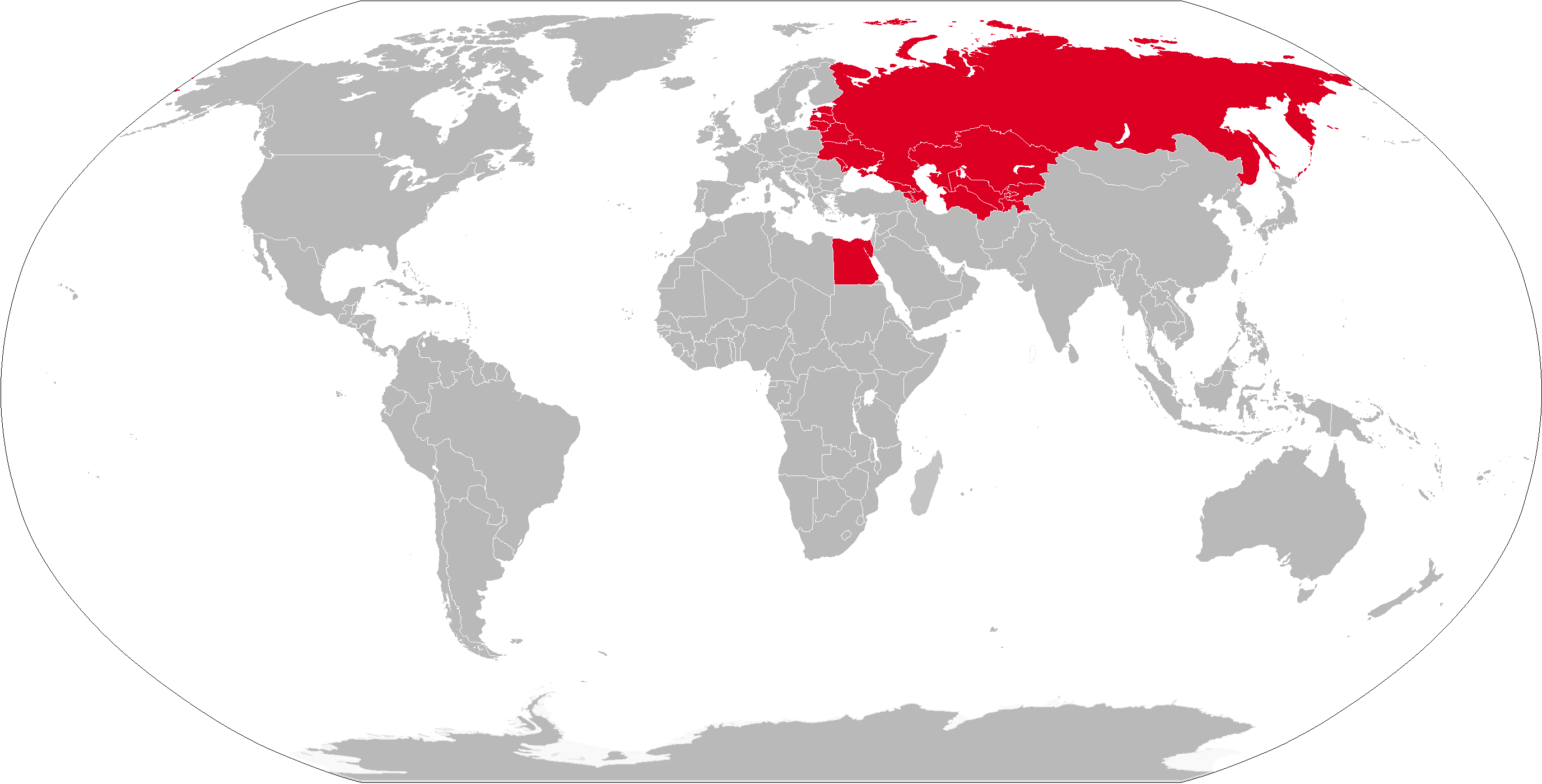
Map with former KSR-2 operators in red

=== Former operators ===
Egypt
Iraq
Soviet Union
