= MKB Raduga =

Russian missile design bureau

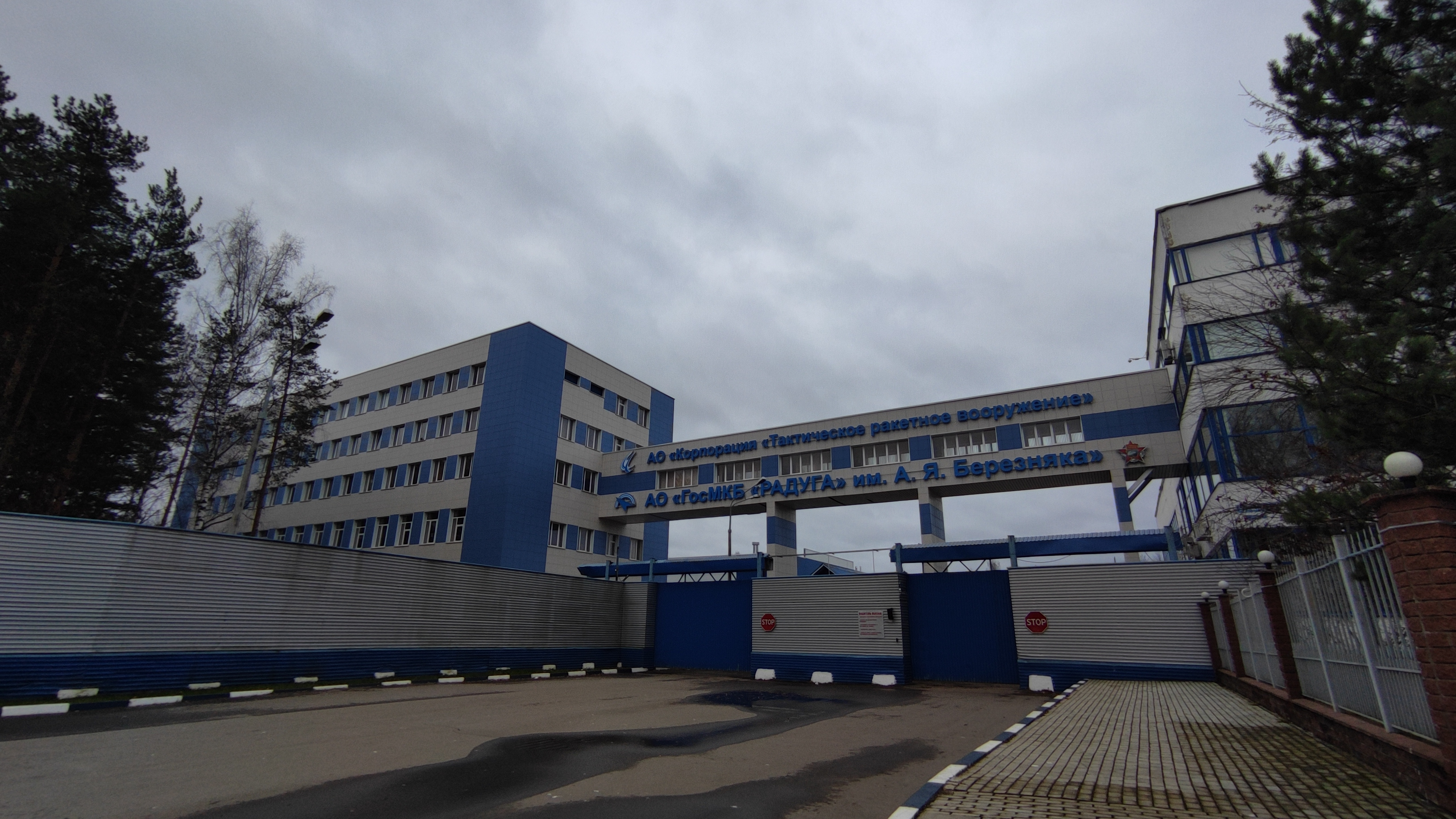
- MKB Raduga facility in Dubna
- Native name: АО «ГосМКБ «Радуга» им. А. Я. Березняка»
- Formerly: OKB-2; Branch No. 2 of OKB-155
- Type: Joint-stock company
- Industry: Aerospace, defense
- Founded: October 12, 1951; 75 years ago in Dubna, Soviet Union
- Headquarters: Dubna, Moscow Oblast, Russia
- Key people: Sergei Bogatikov (general director)
- Products: Missiles, Cruise missiles, Air-launched cruise missiles, Anti-ship missiles
- Revenue: $324 million (2017)
- Parent: Tactical Missiles Corporation

MKB Raduga (Russian: МКБ Радуга, meaning Raduga Design Bureau, where raduga literally means "rainbow"), formally the Joint Stock Company "Raduga State Machine-Building Design Bureau named after A. Ya. Bereznyak" (Russian: АО «ГосМКБ «Радуга» им. А. Я. Березняка»), is a Russian aerospace company headquartered in Dubna, Moscow Oblast. A missile designer for 75 years, credited with more than 50 systems accepted into military service, it is best known for its air-launched cruise missiles, including the Kh-22, Kh-32, Kh-55/Kh-101/Kh-555 and Kh-59/Kh-69 families. Formerly a division of the Mikoyan-Gurevich design bureau, it was spun off as a separate OKB (Russian: опытно-конструкторское бюро) in March 1957, and has been part of the Tactical Missiles Corporation (KTRV) since 2004.

Since 2022 Raduga's weapons – notably the Kh-22, Kh-101 and Kh-32 – have been among the most widely used Russian air-launched weapons in the war in Ukraine, and the company has been placed under sanctions by the United States, the European Union and other states.

== History ==
MKB Raduga traces its history to 1946, when Aleksandr Bereznyak, who had worked on the BI-1 rocket-powered fighter, formed Branch No. 2 of the OKB-155 (MiG) design bureau in Dubna. In 1947 the branch began work on the KS-1 (NATO: AS-1 "Kennel"), the first Soviet air-launched anti-ship cruise missile, roughly based on the MiG-15 airframe. The company's own history dates its foundation to 12 October 1951, when the Minister of Aviation Industry signed order No. 1010 formalising the OKB-155 branch at Dubna's Plant No. 1 to refine and serially produce the KS-1, with Bereznyak as its head.

In March 1957 Bereznyak became the bureau's chief designer, and in June 1965 the bureau was renamed the Machine-Building Design Bureau "Raduga". Between 1972 and 1982 Raduga and the Dubna Machine-Building Plant were amalgamated, first as the "Raduga" Production and Design Association and later as the "Raduga" Production Association, with branches at the Smolensk Aviation Plant and the Moscow "Zenit" plant; the design bureau was afterwards separated again as the independent GosMKB "Raduga".

In 2001 the bureau was named after Bereznyak. It received the Order of the October Revolution in 1983. Vladimir Trusov led the company as general director from 1993 to 2022, when Sergei Bogatikov succeeded him. In 2004 the company joined the Tactical Missiles Corporation. In November 2024, by decree of President Vladimir Putin, the collective of the company was awarded the Order of Alexander Nevsky for strengthening the country's defence capability – its second order. In October 2026 the company marked the 75th anniversary of its 1951 founding.

== Products ==
=== Kometa series ===
- KS-1 Komet (AS-1 "Kennel") - the first Soviet air-launched anti-ship cruise missile, began development 1947
- K-10S (AS-2 "Kipper") - heavy anti-ship missile, Tu-16, 1955

=== Naval P-Series ===
- P-15 Termit (SS-N-2 "Styx") - ship-launched cruise missile (the basis for the Chinese HY-2 Silkworm missile), 1955
- P-270/3M80 Moskit (SS-N-22 "Sunburn") - ramjet-propelled anti-ship missile, 1973, in service 1984

=== Kh/KSR airborne series ===
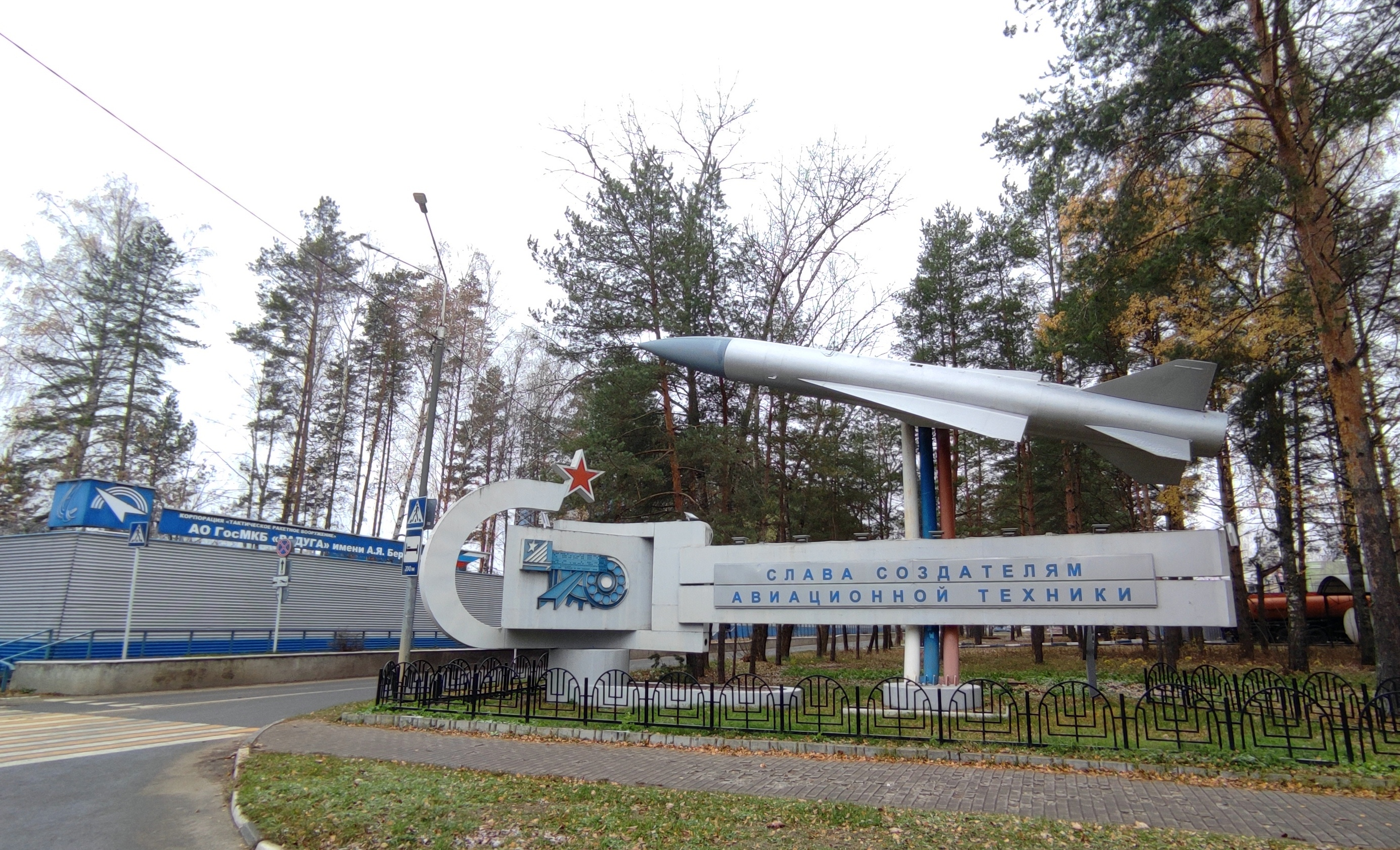
Kh-22 missile memorial near MKB Raduga in Dubna

- R-4/K-9 (AA-4 "Awl") - long-range air-to-air missile, late 1950s
- KSR-2 (AS-5 "Kelt") - 1956, Tu-16KSR-2
- KSR-5/Kh-26 (AS-6 "Kingfish") - Tu-16K-26, Tu-16KSR-2-5, Tu-16KSR-2-5-11. Development of Kh-22. Development authorized 24 August 1962. Officially entered service 12 November 1969 (along with K-10-26). Retired in 1994.
- KSR-11, (AS-5B) - anti-radar missile, air-launched. 1971
- Kh-15 (AS-16 "Kickback") - hypersonic aeroballistic short-range attack missile, using liquid-fuel rocket propulsion. Tu-22M2, M3, Tu-95MS. First missiles were built in 1978. Serial production in mid-1980s.
- Kh-20 (AS-3 "Kangaroo") - air-launched cruise missile, Tu-95K. Development of "K-20 system" (consisting of Kh-20 missile, Tu-95K carrier, etc.) was authorized 11 March 1954.
- Kh-20M (AS-3 "Kangaroo") - Kh-20 with improved thermo-nuclear warhead. K-20 has officially entered service 9 September 1960. Retired in 1991 due to SALT-1 agreement.
- Kh-22 (AS-4 "Kitchen") - anti-ship missile, Tu-22K, Tu-22M, Tu-95K-22. Development of "missile complex K-22" was authorized 15 April 1958. Officially entered service 9 February 1971. K-95-22 (with Tu-95K-22 aircraft) entered service in 1987.
- Kh-28 (AS-9 "Kyle") - anti-radar missile
- Kh-32 - supersonic cruise missile derived from the Kh-22 for the Tu-22M3; accepted into service in 2016
- Kh-45 - Sukhoi T-4, Sukhoi T-4MS
- Kh-55 Granat (AS-15 "Kent") - cruise missile, 1976, Tu-95MS, Tu-160. Development was authorized 8 December 1976. The first serial Kh-55 was launched 23 February 1981. Officially entered service (complex of Kh-55 and Tu-95MS) 31 December 1983.
- Kh-101/Kh-555 (AS-23A "Kodiak") - conventional-armed cruise missile derived from the Kh-55, carried by the Tu-95MS and Tu-160 and used in combat in Syria and Ukraine; series production reported from 2010–11
- Kh-58 (AS-11 "Kilter") - anti-radar missile
- Kh-59 Ovod (AS-13 "Kingbolt") - tactical air-to-surface TV-guided missile
- Kh-59M Ovod-M (AS-18 "Kazoo") - extended-range derivative of the Kh-59
- Kh-69 - stealth air-launched cruise missile developed from the Kh-59MK2, unveiled at the Army-2022 forum and first used in combat in 2024
- Kh-2000 - Sukhoi T-4, Sukhoi T-4MS

=== Others ===
- 85R, 85RU, (SS-N-14 "Silex") - surface-launched torpedo-carrying anti-submarine missiles
- MV-1 - target drone, entered service in 1965
- KSR-5-NM - target drone based on the KSR-5, accepted into service in 1979
- RK-55, S-10 Granat (SSC-X-4 "Slingshot", SS-N-21 "Sampson") - surface, submarine-launched nuclear cruise missiles
- Burlak, Burlak-M air-launched spacecraft launcher, Tu-160SK

== Russian invasion of Ukraine ==
=== Combat use ===
Raduga's missiles have been among the most widely used Russian air-launched weapons in the war in Ukraine.

On 27 June 2022, two Kh-22 missiles struck the Amstor shopping mall in Kremenchuk and a nearby road-machinery plant, killing at least 20 people. Ukraine's air force said the missiles were Kh-22s launched from Tu-22M3 bombers, while Russia said it had targeted an arms depot at the site. In January 2023, a Kh-22 – the type named by Ukraine's military – hit a nine-storey apartment block in Dnipro, destroying one section and killing at least 40 people.

The Kh-32, accepted into service in 2016 as a deep modernisation of the Kh-22 for the Tu-22M3, was first observed in combat use in 2022; Ukraine reported its first shoot-downs of the type in April 2024, including one manufactured in 2023.

The Kh-101/Kh-555, carried by the Tu-95MS and Tu-160, has been repeatedly documented in modified forms since 2023: Kh-101s fitted with chaff and flare countermeasures appeared from early 2023; in January 2024, during a visit by Defence Minister Sergei Shoigu, KTRV and plant representatives said the warhead of one of the bureau's air-launched missiles had been increased from 450 to 800 kilograms, identified by Ukrainian analysts as the Kh-101 at the cost of a reduced range; a twin-warhead Kh-101 was documented in May 2024, with the British Ministry of Defence assessing that the modification had probably halved the missile's range; and a cluster-warhead version was first reported in June 2024 and was filmed striking Chernivtsi in July 2025.

Raduga's newest missile, the Kh-69 – developed from the Kh-59MK2, first displayed in 2009 and reworked around 2015 into a low-observable configuration – was publicly unveiled at the Army-2022 forum in August 2022; in September 2023 the International Institute for Strategic Studies assessed it to be in the final stages of development or in production. Ukraine reported the first combat uses in early 2024, and on 11 April 2024 Kh-69 missiles were used in the strike that destroyed the Trypilska thermal power plant south of Kyiv; Ukrainian officials said the missiles were launched from about 400 kilometres, beyond the previously announced range. According to Ukrainian military intelligence, Raduga is the main contractor of state defence contracts for the supply of the Kh-101 and participates in the supply of the Kh-59M2/M2A (Kh-59MK2).

=== Production ===
Raduga has doubled its workforce and expanded its Dubna works since 2022, raising output of precision weapons by up to eight times on some parameters; new production halls completed by 2024 were equipped with imported machinery from China, Italy and Germany.

Reported Kh-101 output:

Year	Output
2022	250–260
2023	about 420–460
2024	about 500; 575 planned
2025	633 planned; about 50 a month
2026	monthly target 72–80, exceeded; 87 built in July

Batches have been returned over defects including problems with separation from their carrier aircraft, and Kh-32 production has been suspended, its components redirected to other types. As of December 2025 stockpiles stood at about 150 Kh-101s and 300 Kh-22/Kh-32s. The GZUR hypersonic missile was reportedly tested from a Tu-22M3 in 2020. On the night of 27–28 May 2025 drones of the Security Service of Ukraine hit the plant's assembly and equipment shops, starting fires.

=== Sanctions ===
Raduga is subject to international sanctions. On 15 March 2022 it was listed by the European Union among entities associated with Russia's military-industrial complex, in an annex to Council Regulation (EU) 2022/428 amending Regulation (EU) No 833/2014; in June 2022 it was added to the EU asset-freeze list as a subsidiary of the Tactical Missiles Corporation by Council Decision (CFSP) 2022/884. On 24 March 2022 the United States Department of the Treasury's Office of Foreign Assets Control added the company to its SDN List under Executive Order 14024, as an entity owned or controlled by Tactical Missiles Corporation JSC; on 7 April 2022 the Bureau of Industry and Security added it to the Entity List. According to InformNapalm, the company has also been added to the sanctions lists of Canada, Japan and Switzerland.
