= Kh-22 =

Soviet anti-ship missile

Kh-22 (NATO reporting name: AS-4 'Kitchen')
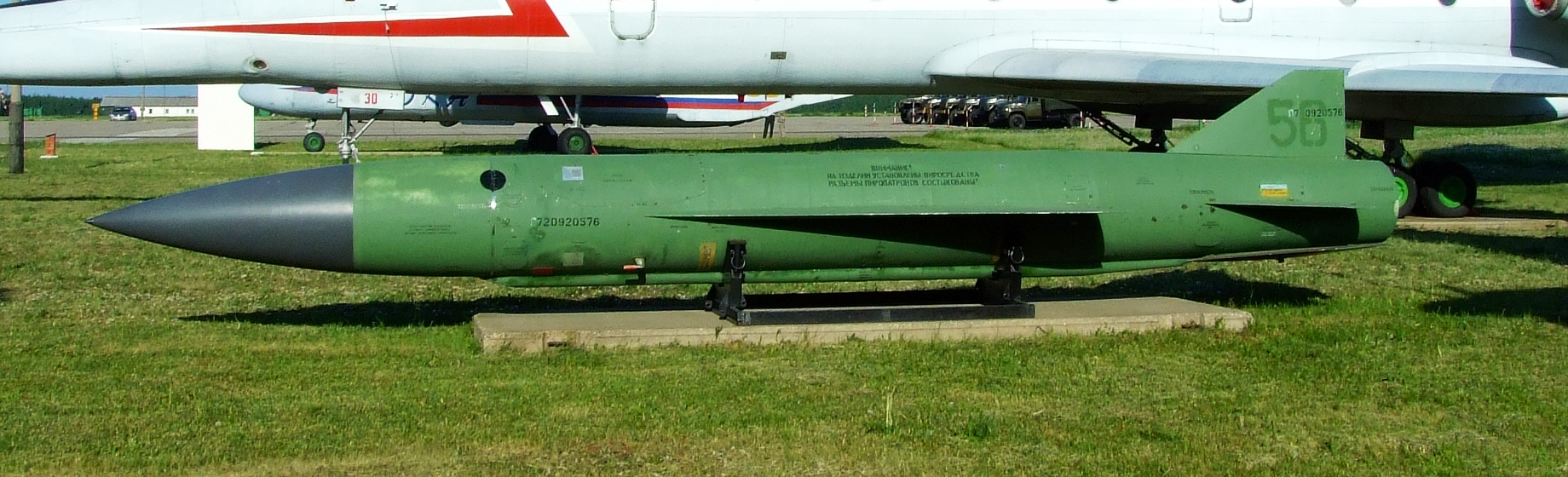
- Kh-22 with aircraft in the background
- Type: Anti-ship cruise missile Air-to-surface missile
- Place of origin: Soviet Union

Service history
- In service: 1968-present
- Used by: Russia
- Wars: Russo-Ukrainian War; Russo-Ukrainian war

Production history
- Designer: MKB Raduga
- Unit cost: $1 million
- Produced: 1962

Specifications
- Mass: 5,820 kg (12,800 lb)
- Length: 11.65 m (38.2 ft)
- Diameter: 92 cm (36 in)
- Wingspan: 300 cm (120 in)
- Warhead: 1,000 kg (2,205 lb) RDX or 350–1,000 kt (1.5–4.2 PJ) thermonuclear weapon
- Engine: R-201 liquid-fuel rocket
- Propellant: Tonka-250 and IRFNA
- Operational range: 600 km (320 nmi) (Kh-22M/MA)
- Flight ceiling: 10–14 km (33,000–46,000 ft) or 27 km (89,000 ft)
- Maximum speed: Mach 4.6 (5,600 km/h; 3,500 mph)
- Guidance system: Inertial guidance followed by terminal active radar homing
- Accuracy: >300 ft (91 m) (CEP)
- Launch platform: Tu-22M, Тu-22К, Тu-95К22

The Kh-22 "Storm" (Russian: Х-22 "Буря", NATO reporting name AS-4 'Kitchen') is a large, long-range anti-ship cruise missile developed by MKB Raduga in the Soviet Union. It was designed for use against aircraft carriers and carrier battle groups, with either a conventional or nuclear warhead. Kh-32 is an updated conventional variant of the Kh-22 and was accepted to service in 2016; it features an improved rocket motor and a new seeker head.

== Development ==
After analyzing World War II naval battles and encounters in the late 1940s and early 1950s, Soviet military thinkers concluded that the era of large seaborne battles was over, and that stand-off attacks would be the way to neutralize and incapacitate large battle groups without having to field a similar force against them. Substituting cruise missiles for air attacks, Soviet Air Forces and Soviet Naval Aviation commanders set about converting their heavy bombers to raketonosets, or missile carriers, which could be launched against approaching enemy fleets from coastal or island airfields. The Kh-22 weapon was developed by the Raduga design bureau and used to arm the Tupolev Tu-22.

== Design ==
The Kh-22 uses a Tumansky liquid-fuel rocket engine, fueled with TG-02 (Tonka-250) and IRFNA (inhibited red fuming nitric acid), giving it a maximum speed of Mach 4.6 and a range of up to 600 km (320 nmi). It can be launched in either high-altitude or low-altitude mode. In high-altitude mode, it climbs to an altitude of 27,000 m (89,000 ft) and makes a high-speed dive into the target, with a terminal speed of about Mach 4.6. In low-altitude mode, it climbs to 12,000 m (39,000 ft) and makes a shallow dive at about Mach 3.5. The missile is guided by a gyroscope-stabilized autopilot in conjunction with a radio altimeter.

Soviet tests revealed that when a shaped charge warhead weighing 1,000 kg (2,200 lb) was used in the missile, the resulting hole measured 5 m (16 ft) in diameter, 19.6 m^{2} (210 ft^{2}) in area, and was 12 m (40 ft) deep.

By August 2016, Russia was finalizing the trials of the Kh-32 cruise missile, a derivative of the Kh-22. Designed for use by the Tu-22M3 bomber, the missile is designed to climb to 40 km (130,000 ft) to the stratosphere after launch, transition to level flight, then perform a steep dive to the target. The cruise missile version is also designed to target enemy ships, as well as radars, and "radio-contrast targets" like bridges, military bases, electric power plants, and others. The Kh-32 has an inertial navigation system and radar homing head, making it independent of GPS/GLONASS navigation satellites. Presumably, it has a range of 1,000 km (620 mi; 540 nmi) and a speed of at least 5,000 km/h (3,100 mph; Mach 4.1). Apparently the missile entered service in the same year. Thirty-two Kh-22 missiles will be modernized to the Kh-32 level in 2018–2020.

== Operational history ==
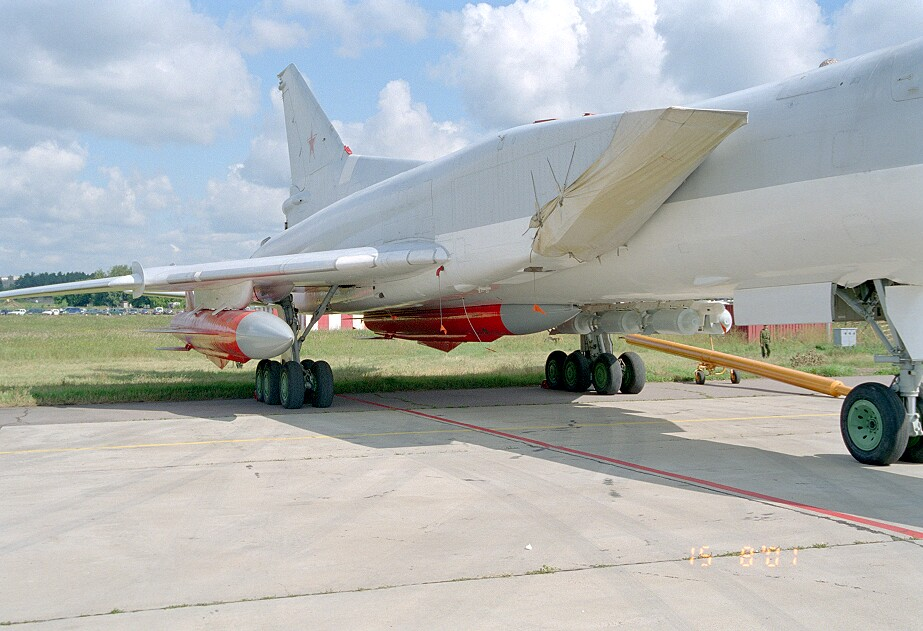
Kh-22 under a Tu-22M3

The first Kh-22PG missile was fired in 1963. The Kh-22 entered service in 1968, along with its missile carrier, the Tu-22K.

=== Soviet era ===
The missiles were used by Soviet and then Russian Air Forces on the Тu-22K ('Blinder-B') and Tu-95K22 ('Bear-G') strategic bombers in patrol mission. The main launch platform is currently the Tupolev Tu-22M3 ('Backfire-C') long-range strategic bomber.

=== 2022 Russian invasion of Ukraine ===
The first combat use of the missile was reported during the 2022 Russian invasion of Ukraine. On 11 May 2022, a video emerged on internet showing a Russian Air Force Tu-22M3 strategic bomber launching a pair of Kh-22 or Kh-32 missiles at targets somewhere in Ukraine.

The UK Ministry of Defence stated that Russia is possibly using anti-ship missiles, like the Kh-22, against ground targets and claimed that such missiles "are highly inaccurate and therefore can cause severe collateral damage and casualties".

On 9 May 2022, 13 Kh-22 missiles were reportedly fired by the Russian Air Force: seven at Fontanka, a coastal village about 15 km (9.3 mi) north of Odesa, where at least one smashed into the Riviera shopping mall around 10:35 PM (after curfew), killing one, and six at targets in the Donetsk Oblast.

Between 12 May and 25 June 2022, at least 10 other Russian Kh-22 strikes in Ukraine, involving at least 44 missiles in total, were reported in the media.

On 27 June 2022, two Kh-22 or Kh-32 missiles, launched by Russian Tupolev Tu-22M3 bombers, were reportedly used in the Kremenchuk shopping mall attack, killing at least 21 people and injuring at least 59. One missile smashed directly into the mall while the other fell about 450 meters away, into the edge of the Kredmash Road Machinery Plant, which primarily manufactures asphalt and concrete mixers, where it injured two of the 100 employees present. Both missiles might have been aimed at the same target since such distance is within the limited accuracy of Kh-22 missiles.

In the night between 30 June and 1 July 2022, three Kh-22 missiles were fired from Tu-22M3s into a 9-storey apartment building and a recreational center in Serhiivka, Ukraine, killing at least 21 people and wounding at least 39.

On 14 September 2022, it was reported at least seven Kh-22 missiles were launched by Russia at various hydraulic structures in Kryvyi Rih, including a nearby dam. This caused the water level of the Inhulets river to increase by 2–3 metres (6 ft 7 in – 9 ft 10 in), or even 5–6 metres (16–20 ft). Previously, the Inhulets was too shallow, allowing the Ukrainian army to build pontoon bridges during its southern counteroffensive. However, Ukrainian MoD claimed that Kh-101 missiles were used in the strike.

On 14 January 2023, a Russian missile strike, possibly using a Kh-22, demolished a 9-storey apartment building in Dnipro and started a large fire. At least 44 civilians were killed and 73 were wounded in the attack.

On 8 May 2023, Ukrainian Air Force spokesman Colonel Yurii Ihnat said that "seven aircraft and up to eight launches of Kh-22 cruise missiles" at Odesa Oblast. Many of the missiles are believed to have self-destructed due to their age. Only one is believed to have hit a food storage warehouse in Odesa. The missiles were fired from Tu-22 bombers.

Three nights of attacks on Odesa, 17–20 July, had been successful due to the then less advanced systems protecting the city compared to those in Kyiv. Out of nineteen cruise missiles fired, Ukraine intercepted five on 20 July. Yurii Ihnat, spokesman for the Ukrainian Air Force, said that “What could be shot down is being shot down,” They required either Patriot missiles or SAMP-T to protect the region from missiles like Kh-22.

During the 29 December 2023 Russian strikes on Ukraine and other attacks, eight X-22/Kh-22s have been fired at Ukraine by Russian forces. None have been shot down by Ukrainian forces. Although it is suggested that Russia has been targeting areas where there are no Patriot missile batteries, of which Ukraine has three, or one SAMP/T.

On 19 April 2024, Ukraine claimed to have shot down two Kh-22/32s for the first time during the war. Pictures were later released showing the Kh-32 was manufactured in 2023.

On 20 August 2024, at the Congress of Local and Regional Authorities, Commander-in-Chief of the Armed Forces of Ukraine Oleksandr Syrskyi for the first time announced data on how many weapons Russia has used since 2022, as well as how many were intercepted. The report said that only 2/362 (0.55%) of Kh-22/32s were intercepted by Ukraine’s air defense.

== Variants ==
Two initial versions were built, the Kh-22 with a large conventional warhead and the Kh-22N with a 350–1000-kiloton nuclear warhead. In the mid-1970s, this was supplemented by the Kh-22P, an anti-radiation missile for the destruction of radar installations. In the 1970s, the Kh-22 was upgraded to Kh-22M and Kh-22MA standard, with new attack profiles, somewhat longer range, and a datalink allowing mid-course updates.

- Kh-22M/MA — upgraded variants with Mach 3.3 speed and 600 km (370 mi) range. Weighs 5,780 kg (12,740 lb), contains 960 kg (2,120 lb) of RDX.
- Kh-32 — an updated conventional variant of Kh-22 with Mach 5 speed and 1,000 km (620 mi) range. It features an improved rocket motor and a new seeker head. Currently produced for the Tu-22M3 launch platform. Warhead weight has been reduced to 500 kg (1,100 lb) to improve range.

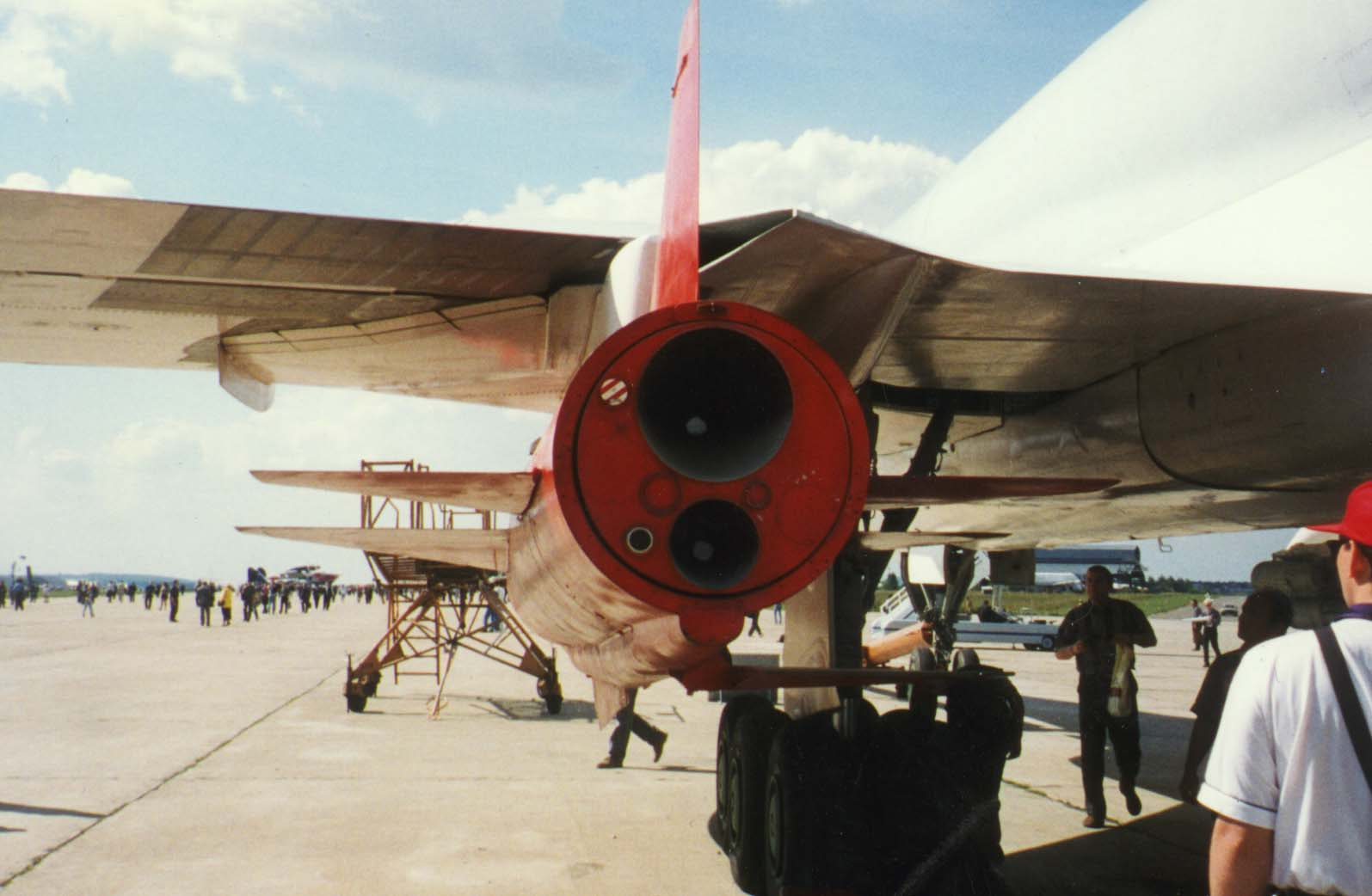
Kh-22 under a Tu-22M3

== Operators ==
=== Current ===
- Russia − Used on Tu-22 bombers

=== Former ===
- Belarus
- Kazakhstan
- Soviet Union − Passed on to successor states
- Ukraine − 423 scrapped after Ukrainian Tu-22M fleet's decommission.
