= Active radar homing =

Missile guidance technique

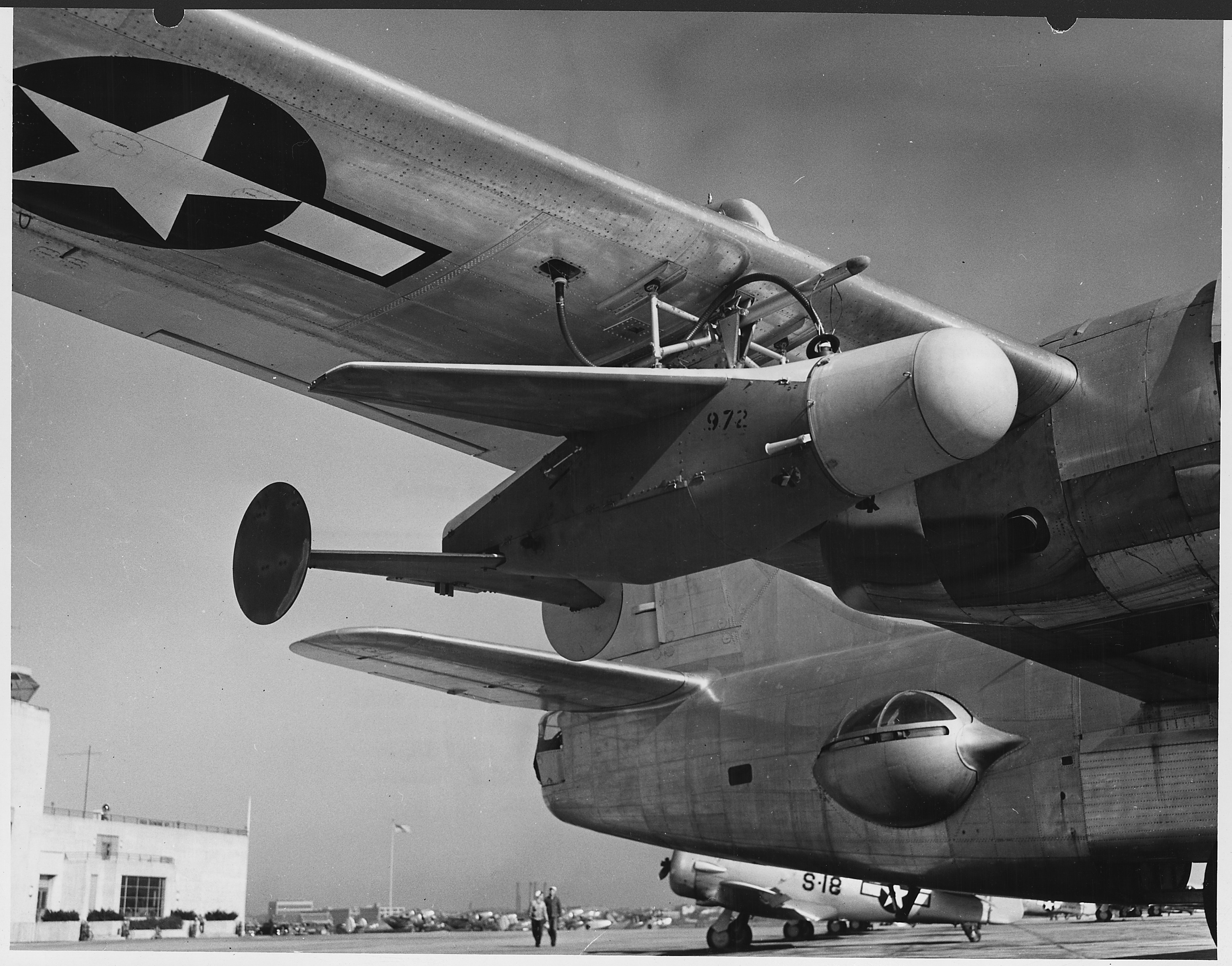
BAT radar guided bomb

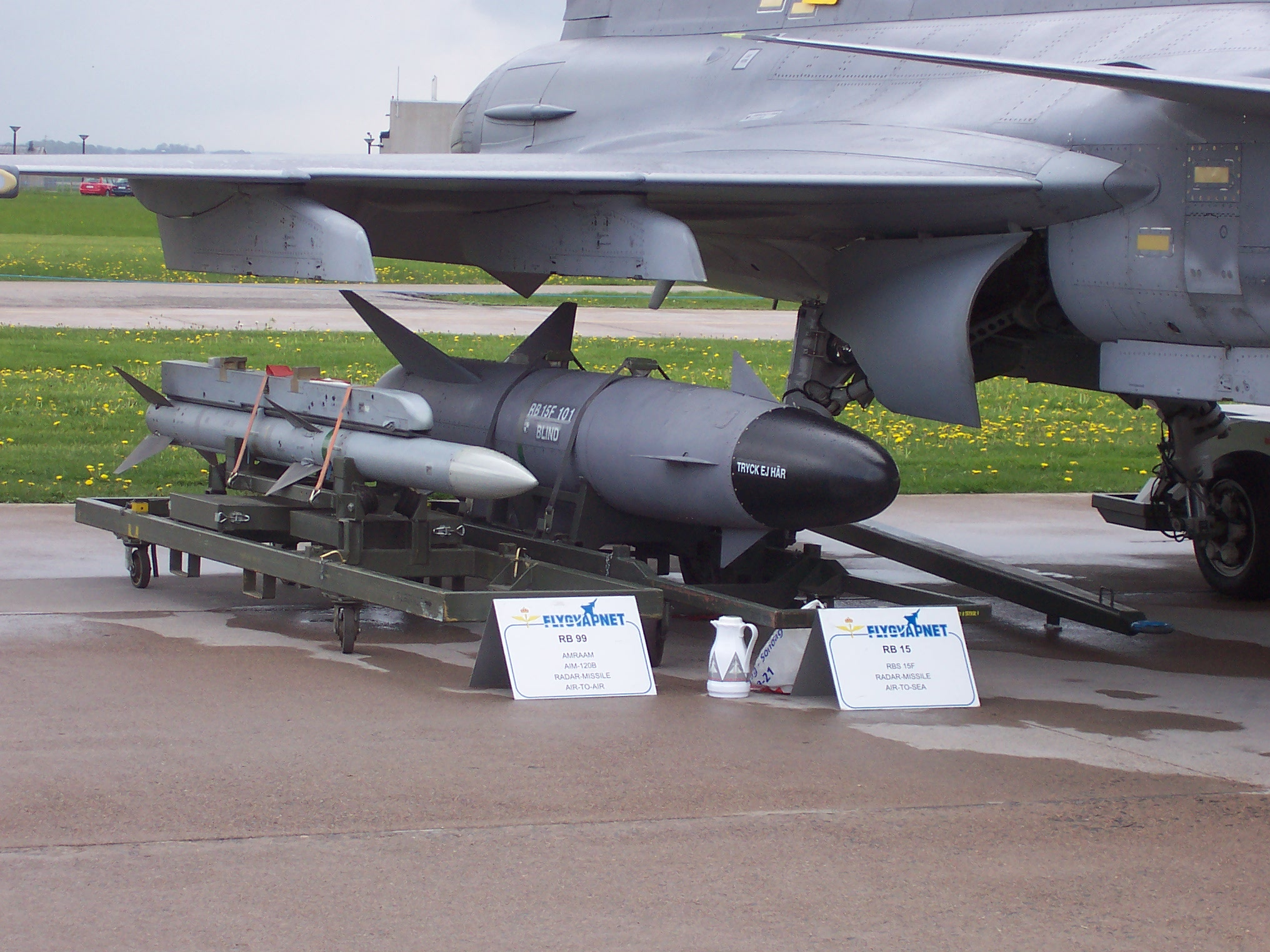
Rb 15F anti-ship missile (on right) under the wing of a JAS 39 Gripen fighter, 2007

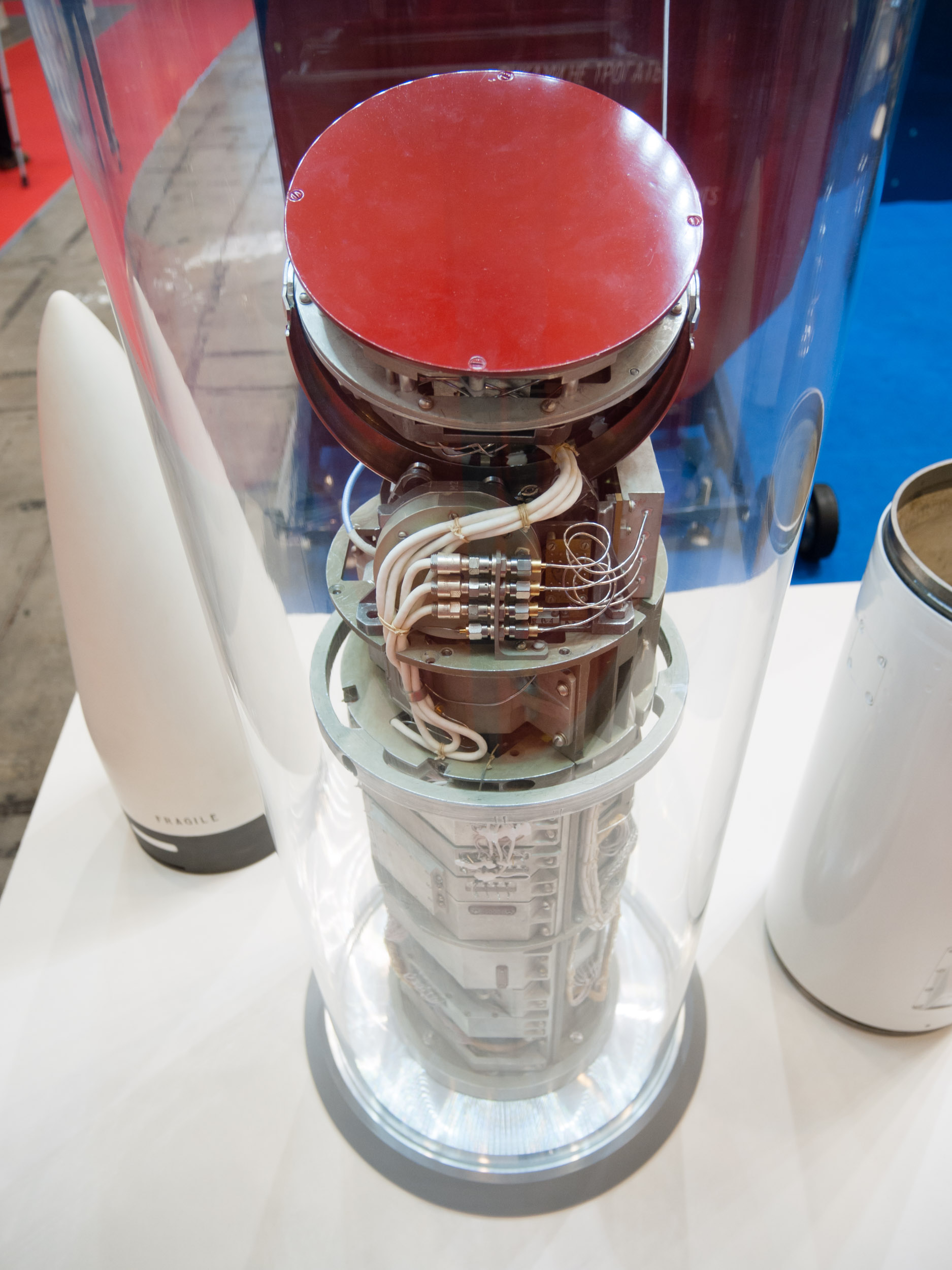
Active radar homing missile seeker

Active radar homing (ARH) is a missile guidance method in which a missile contains a radar transceiver (in contrast to semi-active radar homing, which uses only a receiver) and the electronics necessary for it to find and track its target autonomously.

The NATO brevity code for an air-to-air active radar homing missile launch is Fox Three.

== Advantages ==
There are two major advantages to active radar homing:

- As the missile is tracking the target it is going to be much closer to the target than the launching platform during the terminal phase, thus the missile's tracking can be much more accurate and better resistant to electronic countermeasures. Active radar homing missiles have some of the best kill probabilities, along with missiles employing track-via-missile guidance.
- Because the missile is totally autonomous during the terminal phase, depending on the range at which the missile is launched the launch platform does not need to have its radar enabled at all during this phase, and in the case of a mobile launching platform like an aircraft, can actually exit the scene or undertake other actions while the missile homes in on its target. This is often referred to as fire-and-forget capability and is a significant advantage that modern air-to-air missiles have over their predecessors.

== Disadvantages ==
- Because most missiles are powered by rocket motors, they have no on-board electricity generation capability. This means that active radar-guided missiles usually rely on battery power for the radar transmitter, significantly limiting its power - although this can be mitigated by employing the designs described below.
- Because a complete radar system is implemented, an active system will be more expensive than a semi-active system if all other factors are equal.

== Passive radiation homing ==
Many missiles employing passive homing have an additional capability: if the target does attempt to use noise jamming, the missile can home in on the target's radiation passively (home-on-jam). This gives such missiles improved performance against noise jamming targets and allows anti-aircraft munitions to attack targets they would not otherwise be able to fire on effectively.

== Operation ==
Active radar homing is rarely employed as the only guidance method of a missile. It is most often used during the terminal phase of the engagement, mainly because since the radar transceiver has to be small enough to fit inside a missile and has to be powered from batteries, therefore having a relatively low ERP, its range is limited. To overcome this, most such missiles use a combination of command guidance with an inertial navigation system (INS) in order to fly from the launch point until the target is close enough to be detected and tracked by the missile. The missile therefore requires guidance updates via a datalink from the launching platform up until this point, in case the target is maneuvering, otherwise the missile may get to the projected interception point and find that the target is not there. Sometimes the launching platform (especially if it is an aircraft) may be in danger while continuing to guide the missile in this way until it 'goes active'; In this case it may turn around and leave it to luck that the target ends up in the projected "acquisition basket" when the missile goes active. It is possible for a system other than the launching platform to provide guidance to the missile before it switches its radar on; This may be other, similar fighter aircraft or perhaps an AWACS.

Most anti-ship missiles use active radar homing for terminal guidance.

Many ARH missiles with targets on land or sea use millimeter wave guidance.

== List of missiles ==
Examples of missiles known to use active radar homing (all in their terminal phase) include:

=== Brazil ===
- MANSUP anti-ship missile

=== China ===
- DF-21
- DF-25
- DF-26
- HN-2000
- PL-12 air-to-air missile and SD-10 (export version to Pakistan)
- PL-15 air-to-air missile
- PL-17 and PL-21 long-range AAMs
- HQ-9 air defense missile

=== European ===
- Meteor (missile) long-range air-to-air missile (With contribution from France, Germany, Italy, Spain, Sweden and United Kingdom)
- MBDA Future Cruise/Anti-Ship Weapon (France, UK)
- CAMM (missile family)
- Aster (missile family)

=== France ===
- MBDA Exocet anti-ship missile
- MICA (missile) air-to-air missile and surface-to-air missile

=== Germany ===
- EADS AS.34 Kormoran anti-ship missile

=== India ===
- Astra BVRAAM Air-to-air missile
- Akash-NG Surface-to-air missile
- Barak-8 Surface-to-air missile developed jointly by India and Israel.
- BrahMos Supersonic cruise missile developed jointly by India and Russia.
- Long Range – Anti Ship Missile, long-range hypersonic glide vehicle missile.

=== Iran ===
- Noor/Ghader Anti-ship missile
- Taer 2 Surface-to-air missile

=== Israel ===
- Arrow (Israeli missile)
- David's Sling (missile)
- Derby (missile)
- Python (missile)

=== Japan ===
- Type 80 air-to-ship missile
- Type 81 surface-to-air missile (SAM-1C only)
- Type 88 surface-to-ship missile
- Type 90 ship-to-ship missile
- Type 91 air-to-ship missile
- Type 99 air-to-air missile (Mitsubishi AAM-4, AAM-4Kai)
- Type 03 medium-range surface-to-air missile
- Type 11 surface-to-air missile

=== Russia ===
- NPO Novator and DRDO R-172 long range air-to-air missile
- Vympel NPO R-27 (AA-10 Alamo) medium range air-to-air missile (R-27EA variant only)
- Vympel NPO R-37 (AA-13 Arrow) long range air-to-air missile
- Vympel NPO R-33 (AA-9 Amos) long range air-to-air missile
- Vympel NPO R-77 (AA-12 Adder) medium range air-to-air missile
- Tactical Missiles Corporation Kh-31 (AS-17 Krypton) air-to-surface missile (Kh-31A only)
- Raduga Kh-15 (AS-16 Kickback) air-to-surface missile (Kh-15S only)
- Raduga Kh-59 (AS-13 Kingbolt) air-to-surface missile (Kh-59MK only)
- Tactical Missiles Corporation Kh-25 (AS-10 Karen) air-to-surface missile (Kh-25MA only)
- Raduga KSR-5 (AS-6 Kingfish) anti-shipping missile
- Raduga KSR-2 (AS-5 Kelt) anti-shipping missile
- Raduga Kh-22 (AS-4 Kitchen) anti-shipping missile
- NPO Mashinostroyeniya P-500 Bazalt (SS-N-12 Sandbox) anti-ship missile
- NPO Mashinostroyeniya P-700 Granit (SS-N-19 Shipwreck) anti-ship missile
- Raduga P-270 Moskit (SS-N-22 Sunburn) anti-ship missile
- Tactical Missiles Corporation Kh-35 (SS-N-25 Switchblade) anti-ship missile
- NPO Mashinostroyeniya P-800 Oniks (SS-N-26) anti-ship missile
- NPO Novator 3M-54 Klub (SS-N-27 Sizzler) anti-ship missile
- S-400 long range surface-to-air missile system (40N6E, 9M96E2, 9M96E and 9M96 missiles only)

=== South Africa ===
- R-Darter

=== Sweden ===
- Saab Bofors Dynamics Rb 15 anti-ship missile

=== Taiwan ===
- Sky Sword II air-to-air missile
- Hsiung Feng I
- Hsiung Feng II
- Hsiung Feng IIE
- Hsiung Feng III
- Sky Spear
- Wan Chien
- Yun Feng

=== Türkiye ===
- Gokdogan Air-to-air missile
- Hisar-RF Surface-to-air missile
- Hisar-D Surface-to-air missile

=== United States ===
- Boeing Harpoon anti-ship missile
- Lockheed Martin AGM-114L Hellfire Longbow air-to-surface missile
- Lockheed Martin MIM-104 Patriot surface-to-air missile (MIM-104F PAC-3 version only)
- Martin Marietta Pershing II (topographic radar version of DSMAC)
- Raytheon AIM-54 Phoenix long range air-to-air missile
- Raytheon AIM-120 AMRAAM air-to-air missile and surface-to-air missile
- Raytheon GBU-54/B
- Raytheon R/AIM-174 Standard ERAM (Standard Missile 6) surface/air-to-air missile
- Raytheon AGM-88 HARM (E and G versions only)
- The U.S. Navy's Bat radar-guided glide bomb of World War II, world's earliest munition design known to use an active radar homing system.

== See also ==
- Infrared homing
