= Tupolev Tu-16 =

Soviet heavy bomber

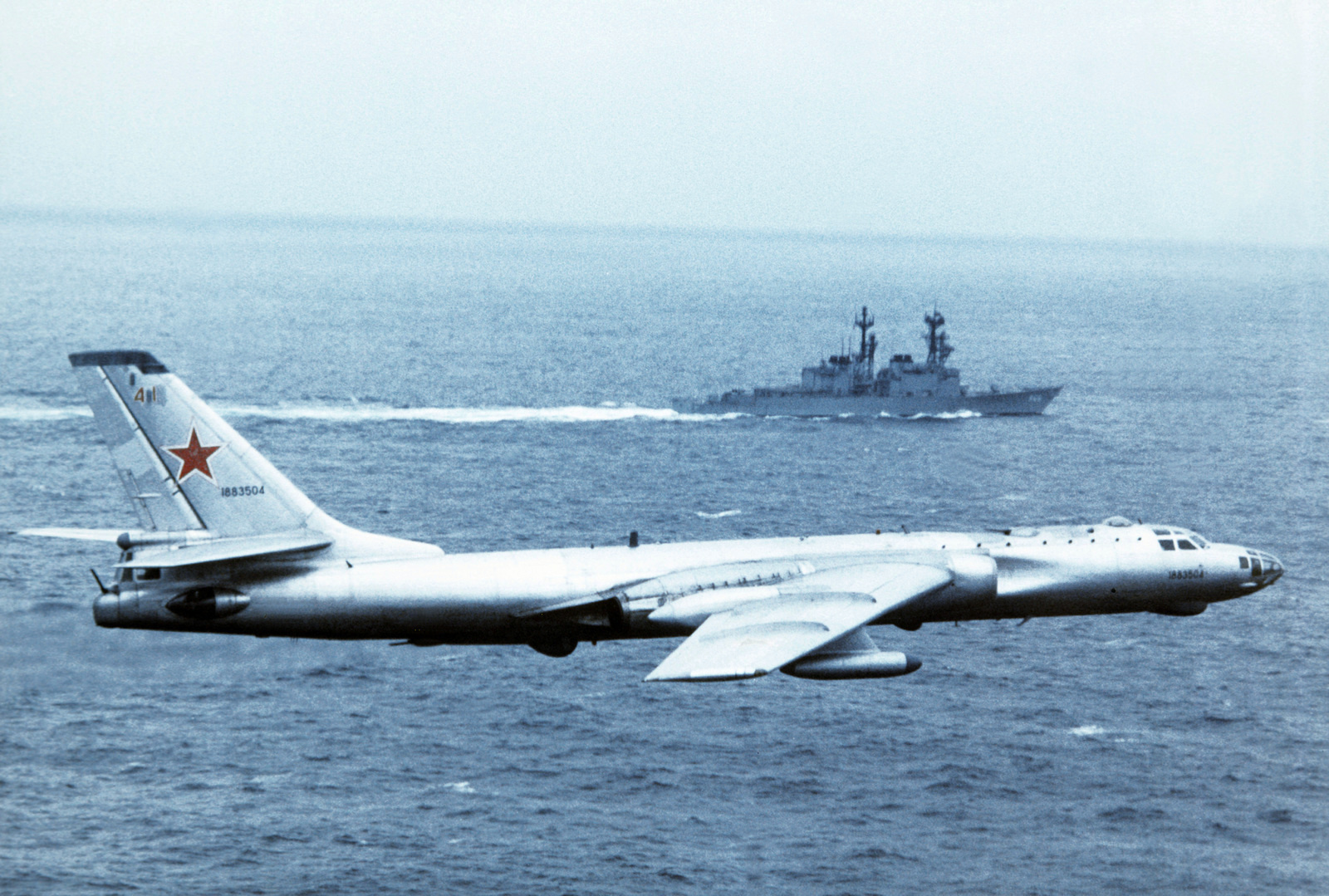
- A Tu-16 flying over USS Hewitt c.1978

General information
- Type: Strategic bomber
- National origin: Soviet Union
- Manufacturer: Voronezh Aircraft Production Association
- Designer: Tupolev
- Status: In service with China as Xi'an H-6
- Primary users: People's Liberation Army Air Force Russian Air Force (historical); Egyptian Air Force (historical); Iraqi Air Force (historical); Indonesian Air Force (historical)
- Number built: 1,509

History
- Manufactured: 1952–1962
- Introduction date: 1954
- First flight: 27 April 1952
- Variant: Xi'an H-6
- Developed into: Tupolev Tu-104; Tupolev Tu-124; Tupolev Tu-107

The Tupolev Tu-16 (DoD: Type 39; NATO: Badger) is a twin-engined jet strategic heavy bomber used by the Soviet Union. It has been flown for almost 70 years. While many aircraft in Soviet service were retired after the Cold War ended, a Chinese license-built version, the Xi'an H-6, remains in service with the People's Liberation Army Air Force.

The bomber saw decades of combat use with the Egyptian and Iraqi Air Forces. Egypt conducted its first combat use in the North Yemen civil war, later in the Six-Day War and Yom Kippur War against Israel, and briefly in the Egyptian–Libyan War. Iraq also used the bomber in the Six-Day War, and later the Iran–Iraq War.

China began license production of Tu-16s in 1959, and developed the H-6 version by 1968. Modern variants such as the H-6K are still being produced as of 2020.

== Development ==
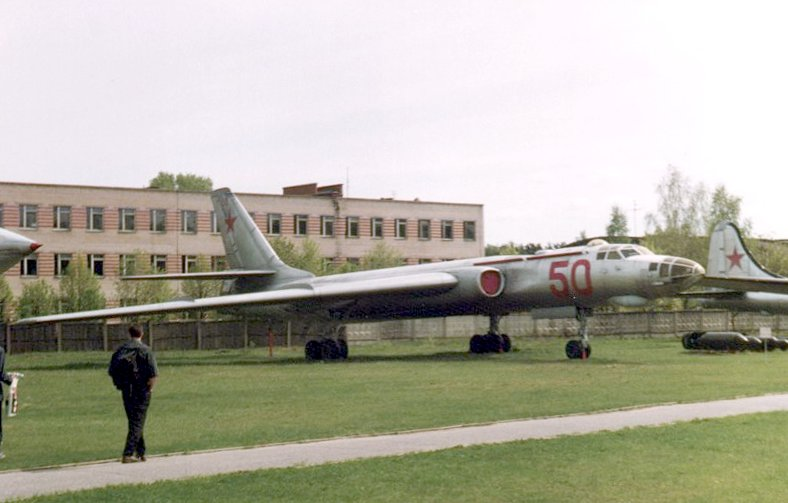
Tu-16 bomber at the Monino Museum (1998)

In the late 1940s, the Soviet Union was strongly committed to matching the United States in strategic bombing capability. The Soviets' only long-range bomber at the time was Tupolev's Tu-4 "Bull", a reverse-engineered copy of the American B-29 Superfortress. The development of the notably powerful Mikulin AM-3 turbojet led to the possibility of a large, jet-powered bomber.

The Tupolev design bureau began work on the Tu-88 ("Aircraft N") prototypes in 1950. The Tu-88 first flew on 27 April 1952. After winning a competition against the Ilyushin Il-46, it was approved for production in December 1952. The first production bombers entered service with Frontal Aviation in 1954, receiving the service designation Tu-16. It received the NATO reporting name Badger-A.

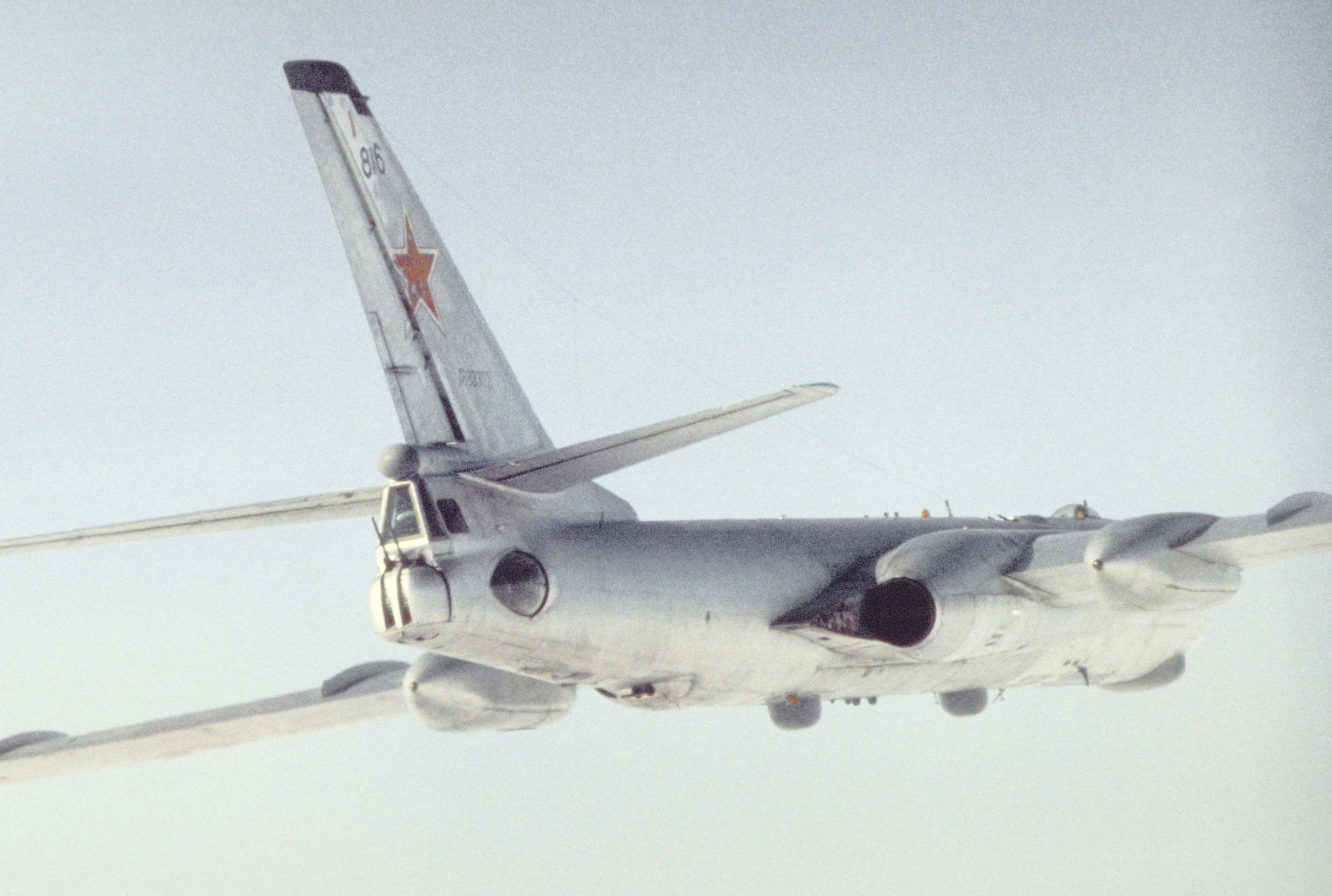
Rear side view of a Tu-16 Badger reconnaissance variant (most likely a Tu-16R) c.1989

It had a new, large swept wing and two large Mikulin AM-3 turbojets, one in each wing root. It could carry a single massive FAB-9000 9,000 kg (20,000 lb) bomb (the Russian equivalent in terms of size of the British Grand Slam, but a conventional bomb rather than a deep ground penetrator) or various nuclear weapons for a range of around 4,800 km (3,000 mi). Production took place in three aviation plants, Kazan Aircraft Production Association, Kuybyshev, and Voronezh Aircraft Production Association.

In 1955, a Tu-16 was used to drop RDS-37, the Soviet Union's first thermonuclear weapon, over Semipalatinsk Test Site, Kazakh Soviet Socialist Republic.

Although the Tu-16 began as a high-altitude, free-fall bomber, in the mid-1950s, it was equipped to carry early Soviet cruise missiles. The Tu-16KS-1 (Badger-B) version could carry AS-1 missiles over a combat radius of 1,800 km (1,100 mi). These very large weapons were aerodynamically similar to the Mikoyan-Gurevich MiG-15 fighter, fitted with either a nuclear or conventional warhead, having a range of about 140 km (85 mi). They were intended for use primarily against US Navy aircraft carriers and other large surface ships. Subsequent Tu-16s were converted to carry later, more advanced missiles, while their designations changed several times.

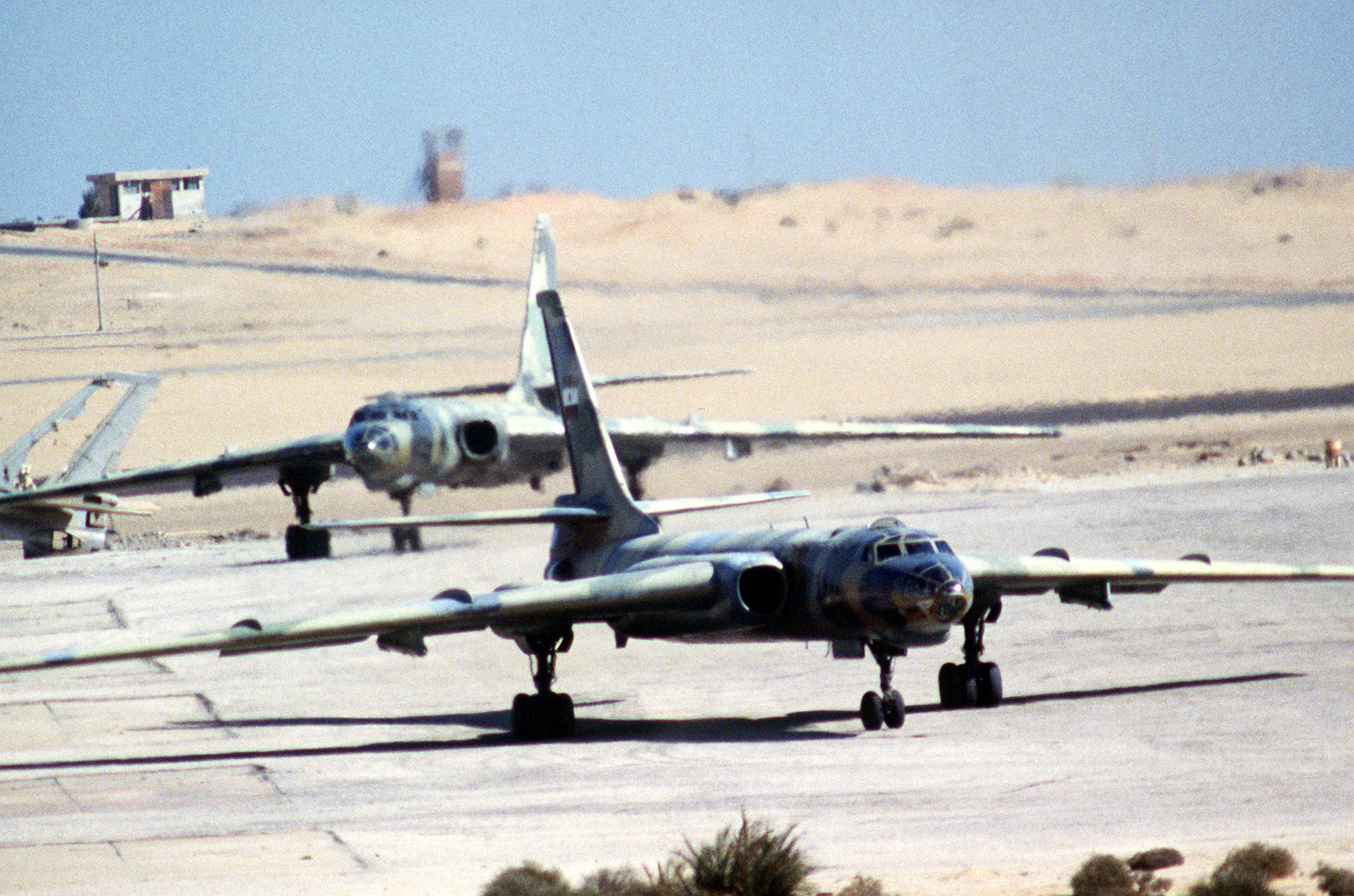
Egyptian Tu-16s c.1980

A versatile design, the Tu-16 was built in numerous specialized variants for aerial reconnaissance, maritime surveillance, electronic intelligence gathering (ELINT), and electronic warfare (ECM). In total, 1,507 aircraft were constructed in three plants in the Soviet Union, in 1954–1962. A civilian adaptation, the Tupolev Tu-104, saw passenger service with Aeroflot. The Tu-16 was also exported to Indonesia, Egypt, and Iraq. It continued to be used by the Air Forces and naval aviation of the Soviet Union and subsequently Russia, until 1993.

Delivery of the Tu-16 to China began in 1958, and the Xi'an Aircraft Industrial Corporation license-produced the aircraft under the Chinese designation Xian H-6. The Soviets provided China with semi-knocked down and complete knock down kits, as well as raw materials for manufacture. The first Chinese-assembled Tu-16 was completed and flown in 1959. After the Sino-Soviet split, the first full domestically-produced H-6 took flight in December 1968. At least 120 of H-6 aircraft remain in service. On 14 May 1965, one of the PLAAF Tu-16 bombers carried out the first airborne nuclear weapon test inside China.

== Operational history ==
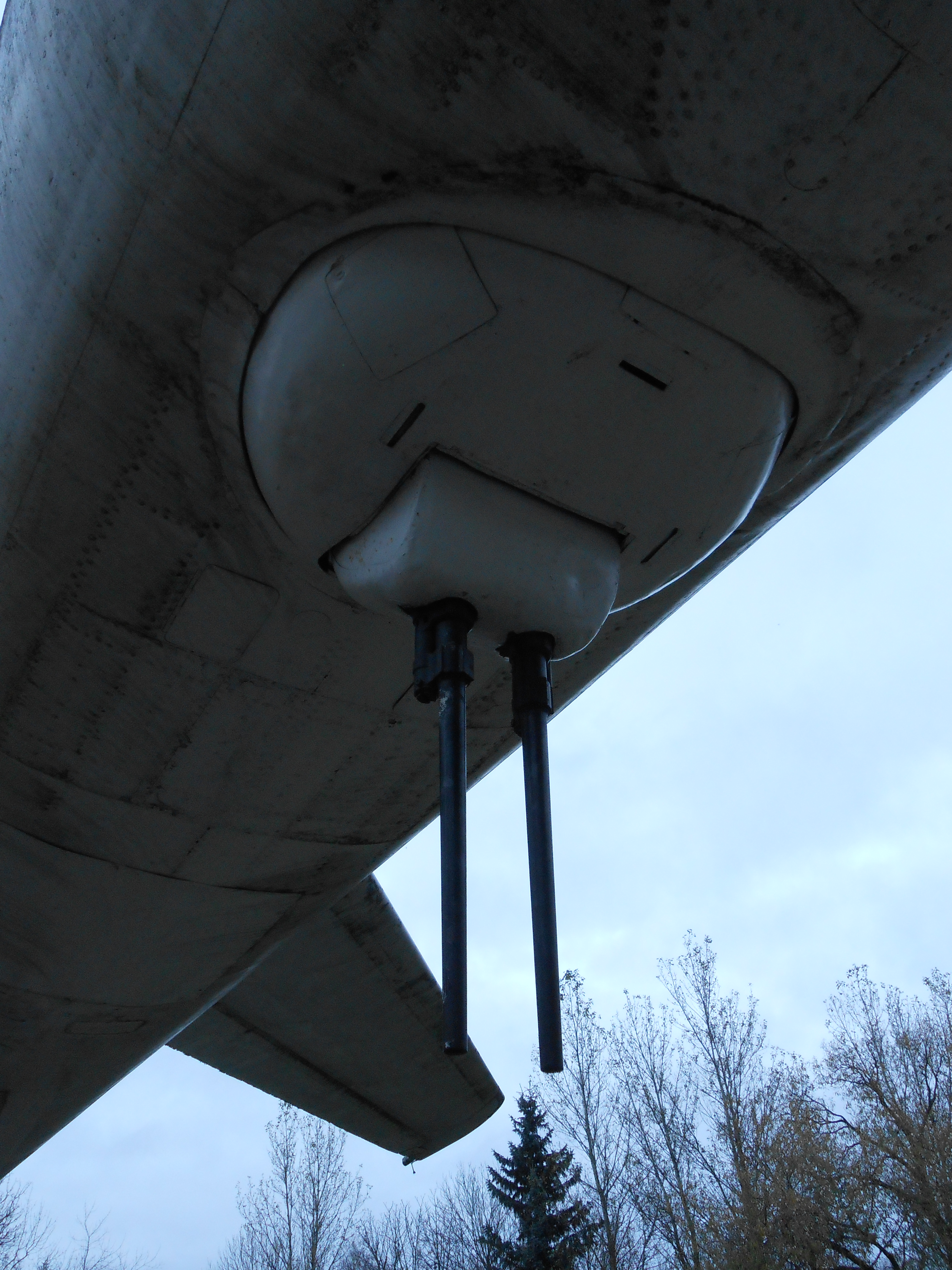
Ventral gun turret

=== Egypt ===
The Tu-16 was first used during the North Yemen civil war by the Egyptian Air Force.

In the Six-Day War, the Israeli Air Force destroyed on the ground 23 of Egypt's 25 Tu-16s, using napalm and cluster munitions.

In the Yom Kippur War, the Egyptian Air Force made extensive use of Tu-16 variants for bombing runs, and the Tu-16K variant for missile attacks.

In the Egyptian–Libyan War, Egypt used Tu-16s to strike Libyan bases and radars.

=== Iraq ===
Tu-16s of the Iraqi Air Force carried out bombing raids on Israel during the Six-Day War. In one such raid, a Tu-16 was damaged and crashed into a barracks at the Ramat David Airbase, killing its crew and 11 to 14 Israeli reservists.

Iraq made use of Tu-16s during the Iran–Iraq War, including to bomb advancing Iranian troops during the Siege of Basra, and for carpet bombing the Iranian capital of Tehran. Iraqi H-6s also made extensive use of the Chinese-exported C-601 anti-ship missile as part of the Tanker war.

During the Gulf War, at least 3 Tu-16s of the Iraqi Air Force were destroyed on the ground.

=== Indonesia ===
Tupolev Tu-16 in Indonesian service saw only provocation and intimidation use in the Indonesia-Malaysian confrontation where 3 was reportedly conducting intimidation missions 2 of which dropped pamphlets in Malaysia while another reportedly flew into Australian territory as a show of force.

Later on 7 December 1963, as part of the larger Indonesian-Malaysian Confrontation an Indonesian Tupolev Tu-16 bomber flew over Tawau bay and bombed the town twice.

== Variants ==
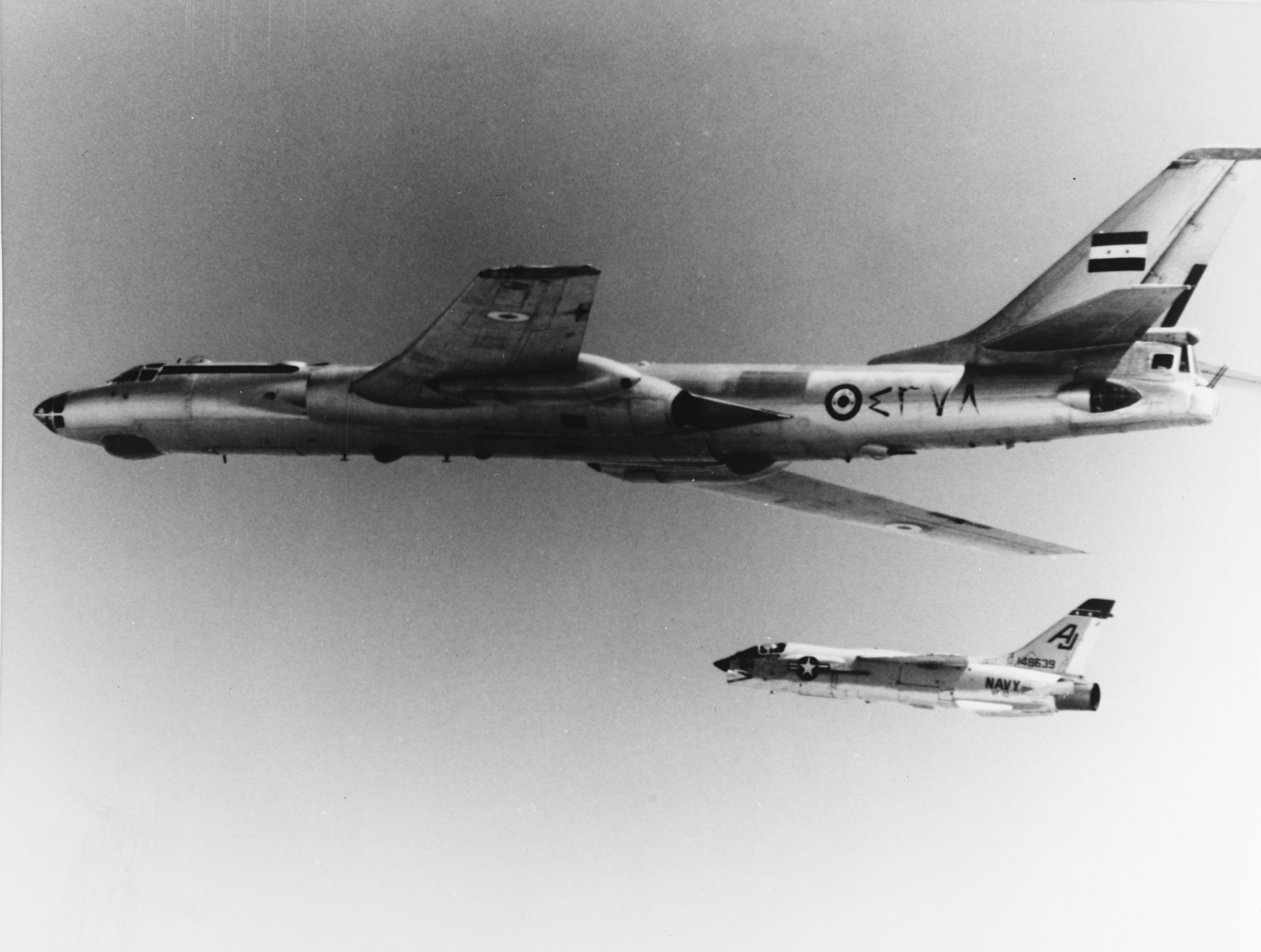
An F-8H Crusader of VF-13 escorts an Egyptian Tupolev Tu-16 in May 1969

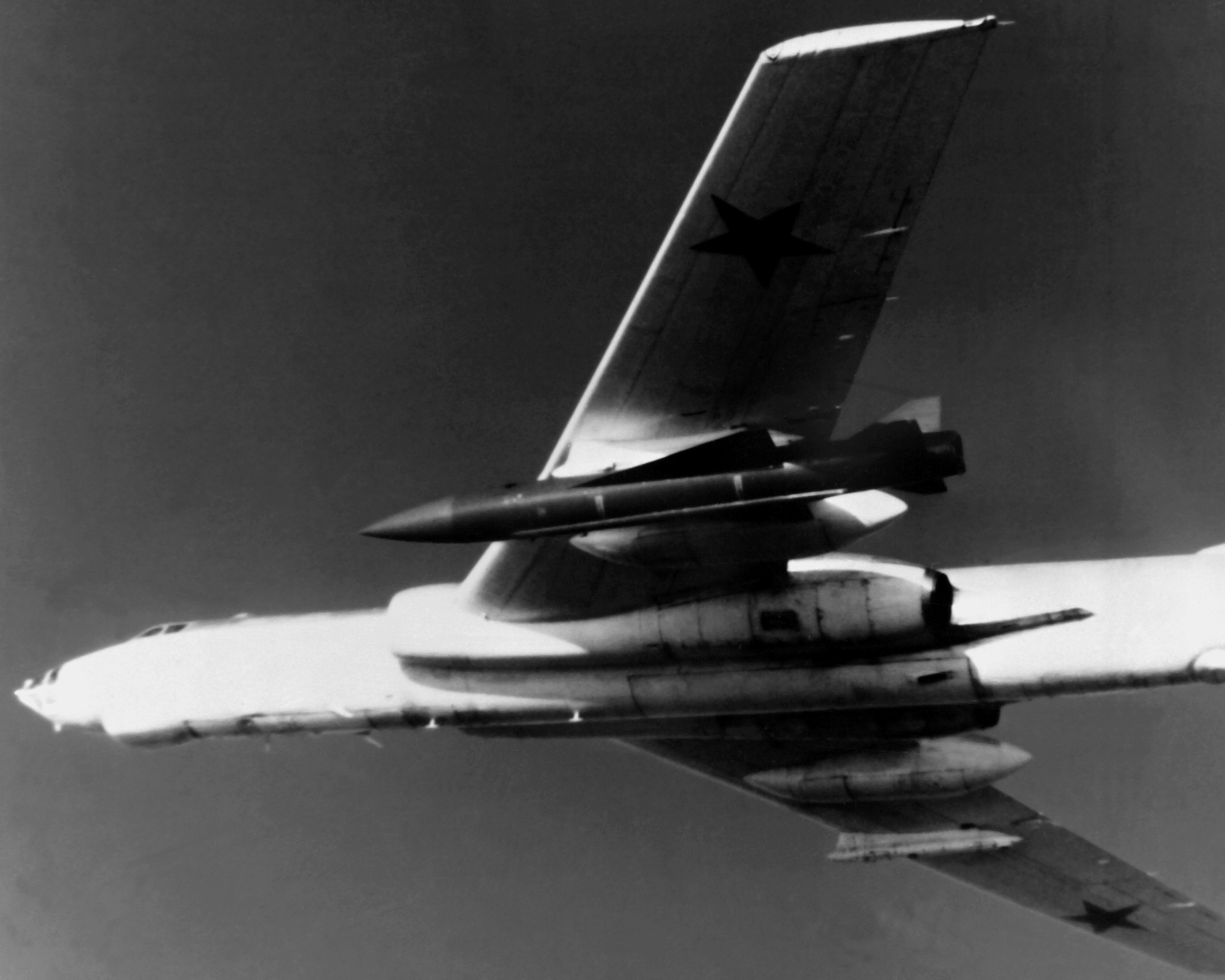
Tu-16 Badger G with KSR-5 missile

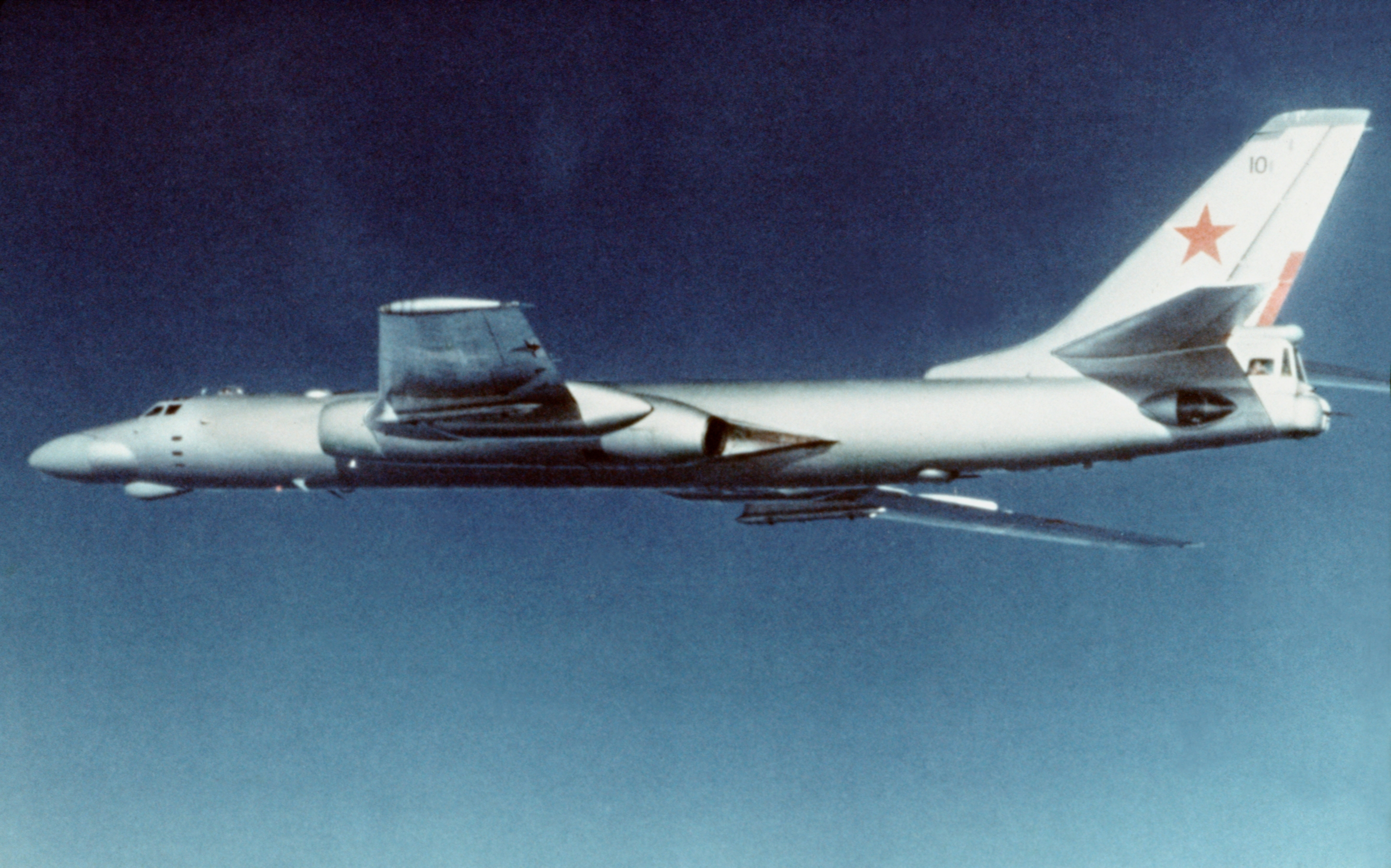
Tu-16K-10-26 Badger C

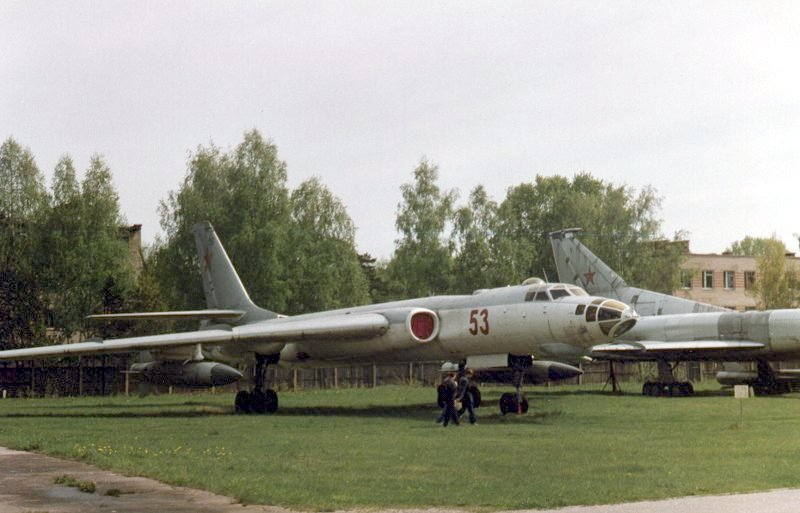
Tu-16K-26 or Tu-16KSR-2-11-16, with KSR-5 missiles under wings (1998)

Among the main production variants of the Badger were the Tu-16 and Tu-16A bombers and Tu-16KS and Tu-16K-10 missile carriers, Tu-16SPS, "Elka", and Tu-16Ye ECM aircraft, Tu-16R reconnaissance aircraft, and Tu-16T torpedo bombers; others were produced from conversions. Individual aircraft could be modified several times, with designations changed, especially concerning missile-carrying aircraft.

- "Aircraft 88" – Initial prototype.
- "Aircraft 97" – Twin-engined long-range bomber development project of Tu-16 with two RD-5 engines.
- "Aircraft 103" – Supersonic bomber development project of Tu-16 with four VD-7 AM-13 engines.
- Badger A (Tu-16) – This is the basic configuration of the Tu-16 bomber deployed in 1954 to replace the Tu-4. Several modified models of this variant existed, all of which were known as Badger A in the West.
  - Tu-16A – Modified Tu-16s designed to carry nuclear bombs, one of main versions, with 453 built. Many of these were subsequently converted into other variants.
  - Tu-16Z – An early specialized version of the Tu-16 that served as airborne tankers (a refuelling method: wing-to-wing), though retaining their medium bomber role.
  - Tu-16G (Tu-104G) – Fast air mail model, Aeroflot aircrew training version.
  - Tu-16N – A dedicated tanker version for Tu-22/Tu-22M bombers, with probe and drogue system. Entered service in 1963. Similar aircraft Tu-16NN converted from Tu-16Z.
  - Tu-16T – Limited production maritime strike version (torpedo bomber), that served in the Soviet Naval Aviation, and carried torpedoes, mines and depth charges. 76 built and some more converted. All units subsequently converted into Tu-16S configuration.
  - Tu-16S – A lifeboat carrier version used for search and rescue operations.
  - Tu-16Ye – These were equipped with heavy electronic warfare and electronic intelligence (ELINT) equipment.
- Badger B (Tu-16KS) – Variant designed as a launch platform for two AS-1 Kennel/KS-1 Komet missiles. 107 built in 1954–1958, served with the Soviet Naval Aviation, Egypt and Indonesia. Soviet ones later converted with newer missiles.
- Badger C (Tu-16K-10) – Another Naval Aviation variant, units of this version carried a single AS-2 Kipper/K-10S anti-ship missile. 216 built in 1958–1963. It differed from other variants in having a radar in a nose. A further development, the Tu-16K-10-26, carried a single K-10S and two KSR-2 or KSR-5 AS-6 Kingfish missiles (K-26 missile complex). Some were later converted into ELINT platforms.
- Badger D (Tu-16RM-1) – Maritime reconnaissance model with ELINT equipment; 23 converted from Tu-16K-10. It retained its radar in a nose and could guide K-10S missiles, fired from other planes, at targets.
- Badger E (Tu-16R) – Reconnaissance version of the airframe, with ELINT equipment, first of all meant for maritime reconnaissance. It could guide KS missiles.
  - Tu-16RM-2 – modified Tu-16R, serving in the Naval Aviation. It could guide KSR-2 missiles.
  - Tu-16KRM – Launch platforms for target drones (a variant of Tu-16K-26).
- Badger F (Tu-16RM-2) – Another reconnaissance version based on the −16R/RM but with the addition of external ELINT equipment.
- Badger G (Tu-16K/Tu-16KSR) – Serving in the Naval Aviation, these were conversions from earlier models. These were designed to carry bombs in internal bays in addition to carrying air-to-surface missiles externally, such as the AS-5 Kelt and AS-6 Kingfish. There existed numerous variants, designated either from carried missile complex (K-11, K-16 and K-26) or from missiles of these complexes (KSR-11, KSR-2 and KSR-5). Following further modifications, they were also given suffixes. Main variants:
  - Tu-16KSR-2 – carrying the K-16 complex (two KSR-2 missiles). Used from 1962. Similar aircraft, converted from other variants, were designated Tu-16K-16.
  - Tu-16K-11-16 – carrying the K-16 complex (KSR-2 missiles) or the K-11 complex (two anti-radar KSR-11 missiles). Used from 1962. Similar aircraft were designated Tu-16KSR-2-11. Over 440 Tu-16 could carry the K-16 or K-11 complex.
  - Tu-16K-26 – carrying the K-26 complex (two KSR-5 missiles), retaining a capability of KSR-2 and 11 missiles. Used from 1969. Similar aircraft were designated Tu-16KSR-2-5-11 or Tu-16KSR-2-5 (no KSR-11 capability). Over 240 Tu-16 could carry the K-26 complex.
  - Tu-16K-26P – carrying the K-26P missiles (two anti-radar KSR-5P missiles, as well as KSR-5, 2 or 11).
- Badger H (Tu-16 Elka) – Designed for stand-off electronic warfare and electronic counter-measures support.
- Badger J (Tu-16P Buket) – Another electronic warfare variant configured as an ECM strike escort.
- Badger K (Tu-16Ye) – Believed to be a version of the Badger F configuration possessing enhanced ELINT capability.
- Badger L (Tu-16P) – Another version of the Badger J with more modern systems and used in ELINT role.
- "Aircraft 90" – Turboprop-powered project.
- Tu-104 – Civilian airliner version.

== Former operators ==
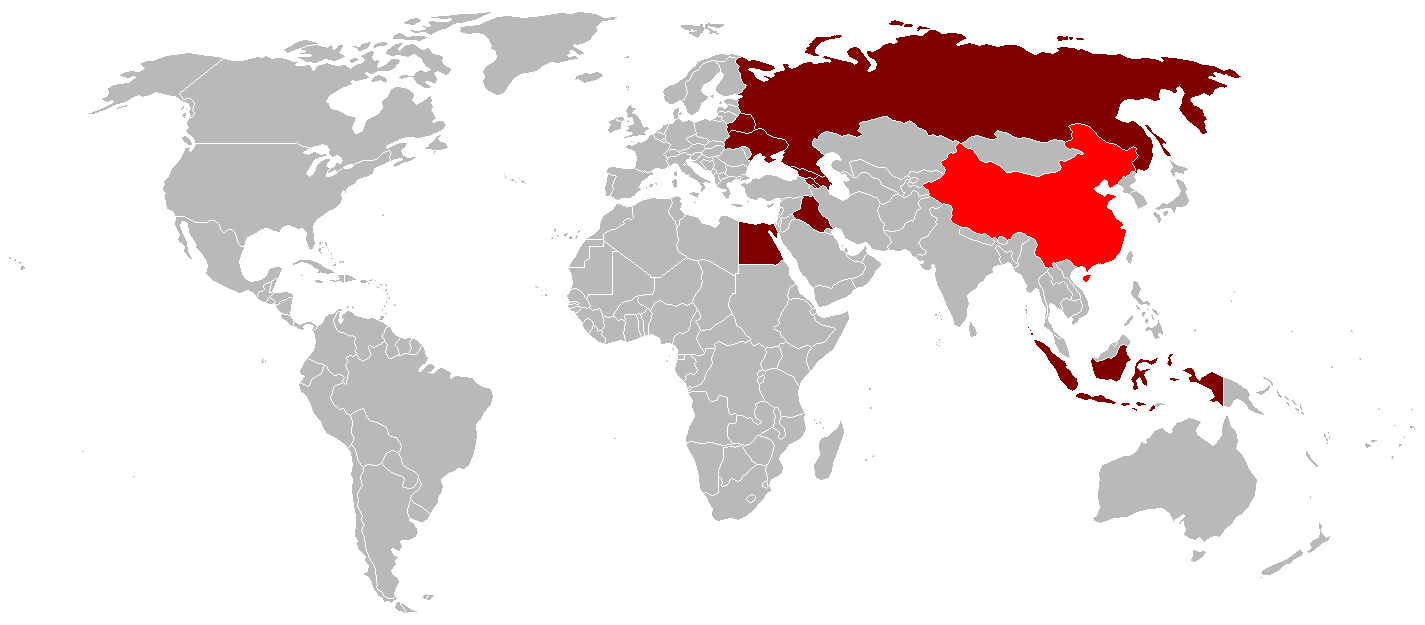
Current operators of the Tu-16/H-6 Former operators

Armenia

- Armenian Air Force: 30 aircraft inherited from the Soviet Union. Out of service by 1995.

Azerbaijan

- Azerbaijan Air Force: 10 aircraft inherited from the Soviet Union. Out of service by 1995.

Belarus

- Belarus Air Force: 18 aircraft inherited upon the fall of the Soviet Union, out of service by 1995.

China

- People's Liberation Army Air Force: A few Tu-16s were acquired in 1959; the type was then built under licence as the Xian H-6.

Egypt

- Egyptian Air Force: Operated Tu-16KS, Tu-16T, Tu-16KSR-2-11, and Tu-16R. Also operated H-6. Last retired in 2000. By 1966, Air Group 65, with its primary base at Cairo West Air Base, was operating three squadrons of Tu-16s: No. 34 and 36 Squadrons with bomber variants, and No. 95 Squadron equipped with the Tu-16KS' that could carry AS-1 Kennel air-to-surface missiles.

Georgia

- Georgian Air Force: 20 aircraft inherited from the Soviet Union. Out of service by 1995.

Indonesia

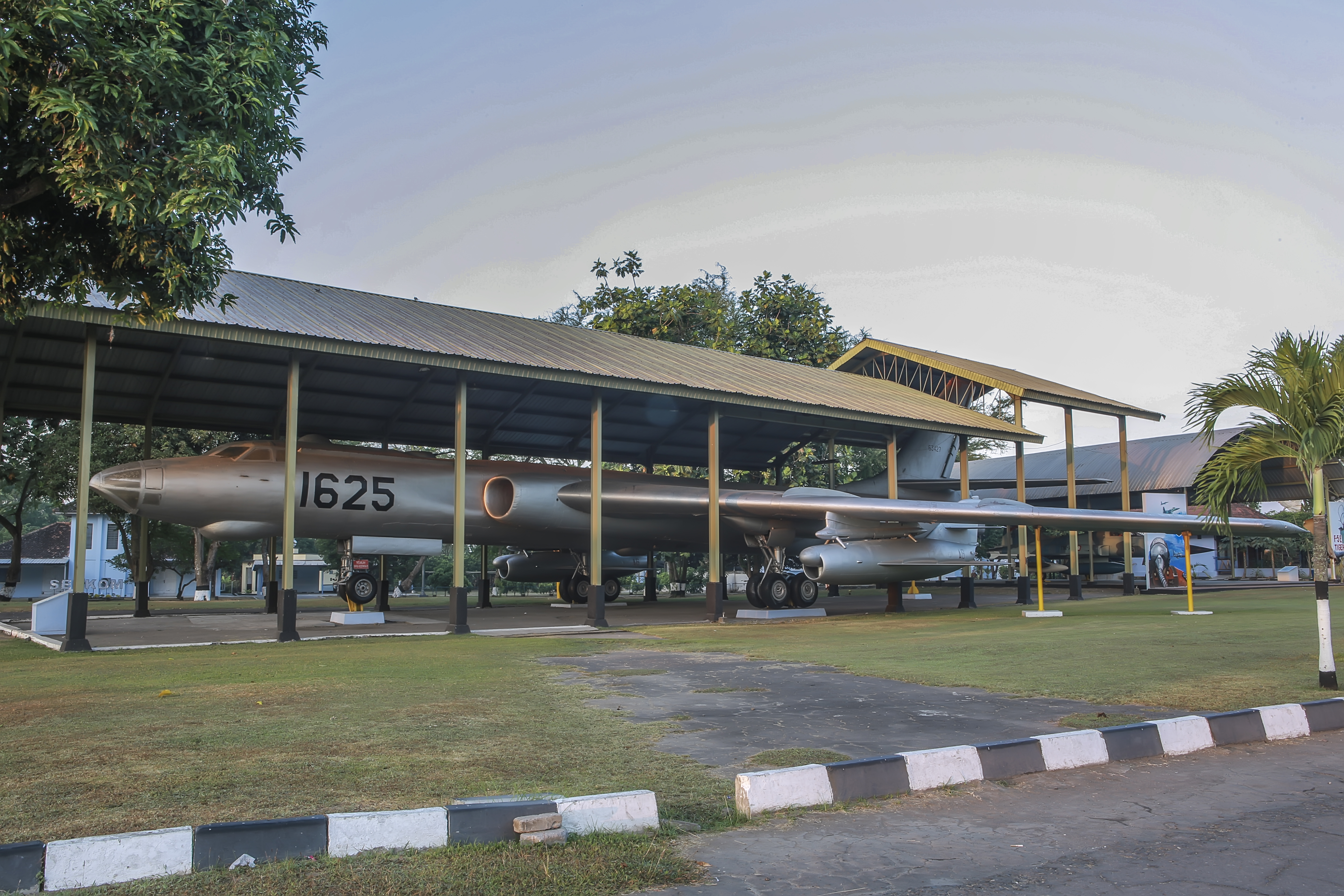
Indonesian Air Force Tu-16KS-1 at Dirgantara Mandala Museum

- Indonesian Air Force: 12 Tu-16, 12 Tu-16KS-1, and 2 Tu-16R. The first Tu-16 was delivered in 1961. Used during the preparation of Operation Trikora in 1962 and during Indonesia–Malaysia confrontation in 1963–1966. The bomber and recon variant were operated by 41st Air Squadron, while the KS-1 was operated by 42nd Air Squadron. They were primarily based at Iswahjudi Air Force Base in Madiun, East Java. They were grounded in 1969 and removed from service in 1970.

Iraq

- Iraqi Air Force: 8 Tu-16 and 6 Tu-16KSR-2-11. Also operated 4 B-6D (H-6D). One B-6D was downed during the Iran-Iraq War. Two were destroyed in Operation Desert Storm in 1991.

Russia
Retired from military service by 1995. A few aircraft were maintained and operated by designers and manufacturers for testing until 2001−2002, when it was finally retired

- Russian Air Force
- Russian Naval Aviation

Soviet Union

- Soviet Air Force (transferred to successor states)
- Soviet Naval Aviation (transferred to successor states)

Ukraine

- Ukrainian Air Force: 121 aircraft inherited from USSR. All retired from service.

== Notable accidents ==
- On 25 May 1968 a Soviet Air Force Tu-16 Badger-F piloted by Colonel Andrey Pliyev buzzed the US Navy aircraft carrier USS Essex (CV-9) in the Norwegian Sea. The Tu-16 made four passes, and on the last a wing clipped the sea and it crashed with no survivors. Parts of three bodies were recovered by the US.
- On 1 February 1971 a modified Tu-16 flying laboratory crashed during testing of a new jet engine, resulting in the death of the entire crew, including test pilot Amet-khan Sultan.
- On 28 August 1978 an early model Tu-16 crashed on Hopen island in Svalbard, Norway. All seven crew were killed in the accident. It was discovered by a four-man Norwegian weather forecasting team. The Soviets refused to admit the loss of an aircraft until the bodies of the crew were given to them. Norway transcribed the contents of the flight recorder over the objections of the Soviet government.
- On 27 June 1980 a Soviet Air Force Tu-16 Badger on a Tokyo Express flight crashed near Komatsu Air Base in Ishikawa Prefecture in the Sea of Japan. There were no survivors. The remains of three crew members were recovered by the Japanese Maritime Self-Defense Force ship Nemuro.

== Specifications (Tu-16) ==
Orthographic projection of the Tupolev Tu-16.

General characteristics

- Crew: 6-7
- Length: 34.80 m (114 ft 2 in)
- Wingspan: 33.00 m (108 ft 3 in)
- Height: 10.36 m (34 ft 0 in)
- Wing area: 165 m^{2} (1,780 sq ft)
- Empty weight: 37,200 kg (82,012 lb)
- Gross weight: 76,000 kg (167,551 lb)
- Max takeoff weight: 79,000 kg (174,165 lb)
- Powerplant: 2 × Mikulin AM-3 M-500 turbojets, 93.2 kN (21,000 lbf) thrust each

Performance

- Maximum speed: 1,050 km/h (650 mph, 570 kn)
- Range: 7,200 km (4,500 mi, 3,900 nmi)
- Service ceiling: 12,800 m (42,000 ft)
- Wing loading: 460 kg/m^{2} (94 lb/sq ft)
- Thrust/weight: 0.24

Armament

- Guns: 6–7 × 23 mm Afanasev Makarov AM-23 cannons, two each in dorsal and ventral remote turrets and manned tail turret, with the occasional addition of one fixed forward in the nose
- Hardpoints: 2 Underwing hardpoints for missiles and a bomb bay for missiles or bombs (depending on variant)
- Missiles:
  - Badger-B 2 × Raduga KS-1 Komet (AS-1 Kennel) anti-ship missile on underwing hardpoints
  - Badger-C 1 × Raduga K-10S (AS-2 Kipper) anti-ship missile semi-recessed in bomb bay
  - Badger-C/G 2 × Raduga KSR-2 (AS-5 Kelt) or Raduga KSR-5 (AS-6 Kingfish) anti-ship missile on underwing hardpoints
- Bombs: Badger-A + Export versions 9,000 kg (20,000 lb) of free-fall weapons

== See also ==
Related development

- Tupolev Tu-104
- Tupolev Tu-124
- Xian H-6
- Tupolev Tu-107

Aircraft of comparable role, configuration, and era

- Avro Vulcan
- Boeing B-47 Stratojet
- Myasishchev M-4
- Handley Page Victor
- Vickers Valiant
