= Aircraft ordnance =

Weapons used by aircraft

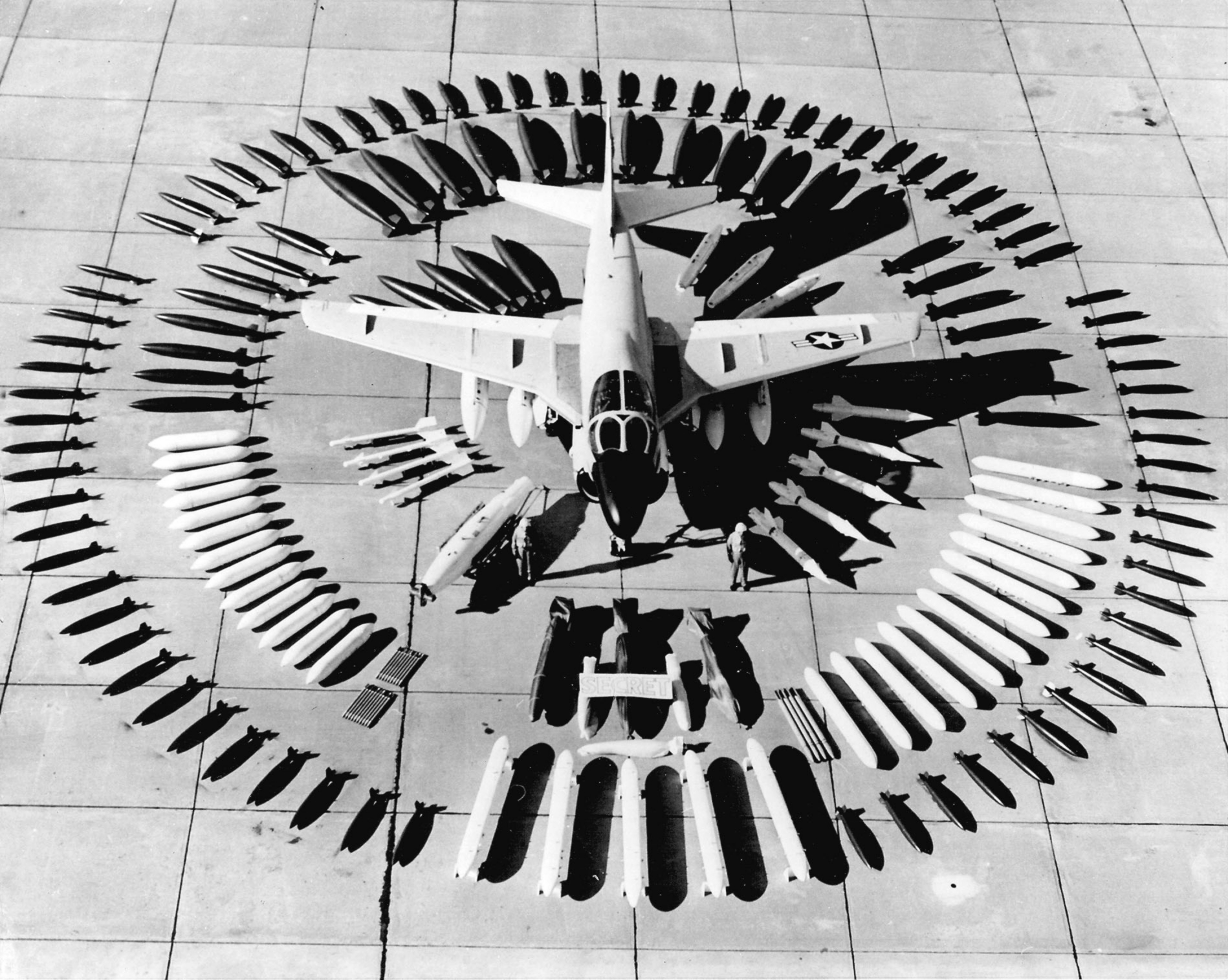
Grumman A-6 Intruder (A2F-1) attack aircraft displaying its weapons array, 1962

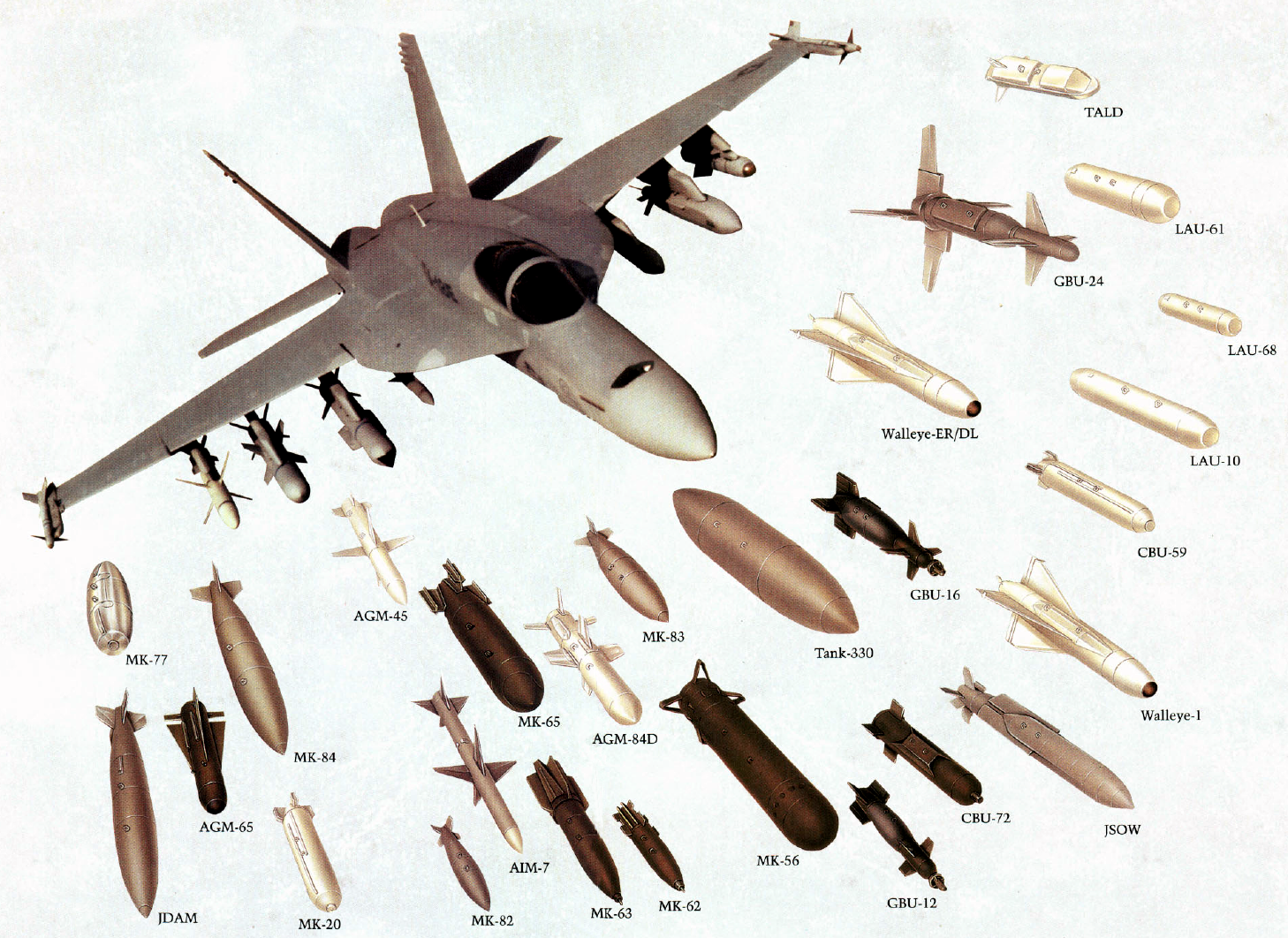
US Navy Boeing F/A-18E/F Super Hornet multirole combat aircraft illustrating its array of weapons-type capabilities; All Hands magazine of the US Navy 1997

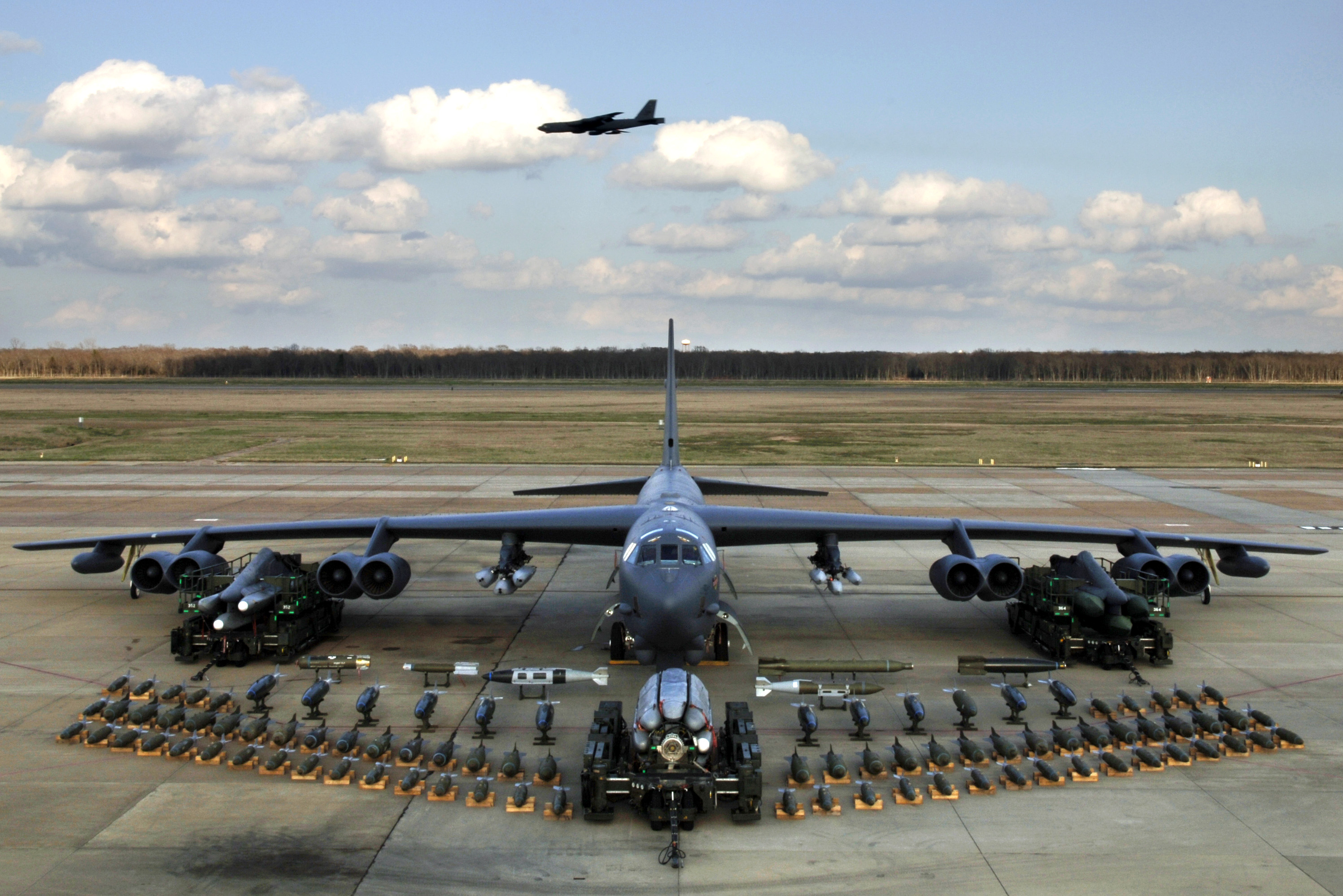
B-52H Stratofortress subsonic strategic bomber displaying its weapons array, 2006

Aircraft ordnance or ordnance (in the context of military aviation) is any expendable weaponry (e.g. bombs, missiles, rockets and gun ammunition) used by military aircraft. The term is often used when describing the payload of air-to-ground weaponry that can be carried by the aircraft or the weight that has been dropped in combat. Aircraft ordnance also includes air-to-air, anti-ship and anti-submarine weapons. Ordnance can be carried in a bomb bay or hung from a hardpoint.

Some aircraft types can carry a wide variety of ordnance – for example, the Fairchild AU-23 Peacemaker could use forward-firing gun pods, 500 and 250 pound bombs, napalm units, cluster bomb units, flares, rockets, smoke grenades and propaganda leaflet dispensers.

For many weapons there is a limit to the length of time they can be flown (e.g. because of vibration damage); after this their safety or effectiveness is not guaranteed. This can be a problem if weapons designed for high intensity conflict are carried on multiple missions in a long counter-insurgency campaign.

== History ==
The first recorded use of aircraft ordinance during a conflict was during the Italo-Turkish War in 1911. The Italian Army Air Corps Blériot XI and Nieuport IV used monoplanes to bomb a Turkish camp at Ain Zara in Libya. The First World War which followed shortly after saw rapid development for aircraft and their corresponding ordinance.

== Guidance ==
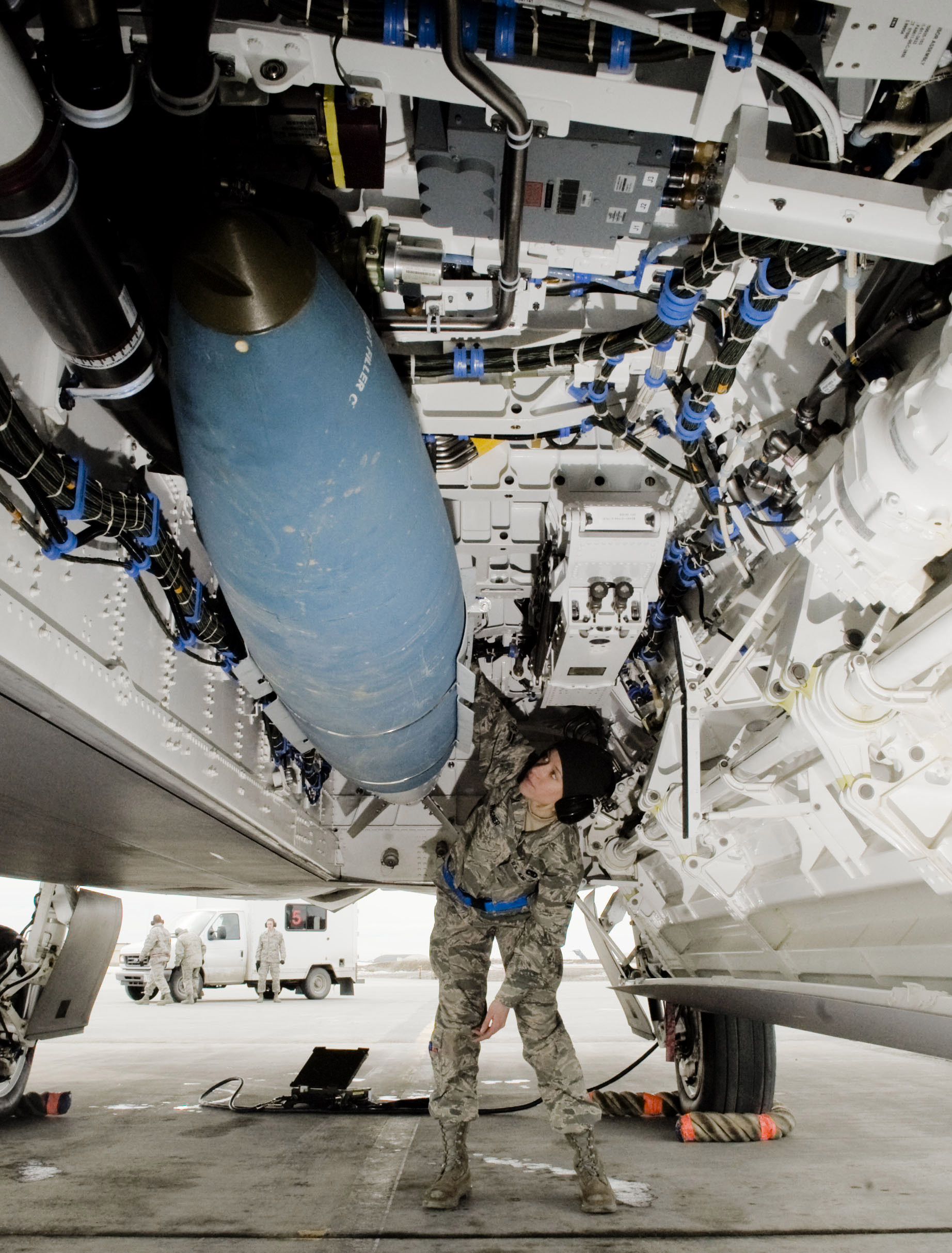
Airman inspecting a Joint Direct Attack Munition (JDAM) after being loaded onto an F-22 Raptor

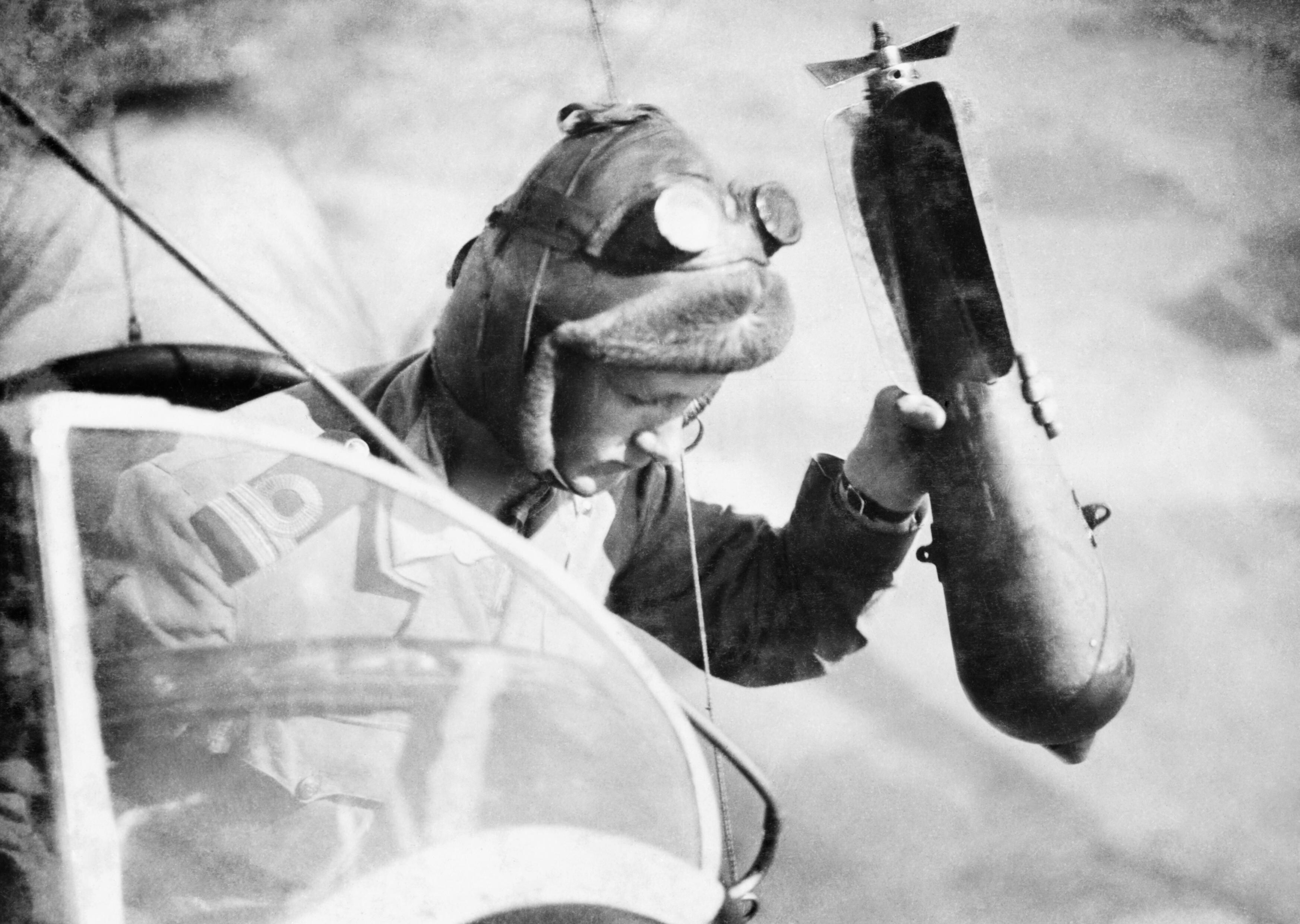
A crew member of a British SS 'Z' Class airship about to throw a bomb from the rear cockpit of the gondola.

Ordnance can be divided into guided and unguided categories based on their targeting capabilities. Guided ordnance, such as precision-guided munitions (PGMs), use advanced technologies like GPS, infrared, radar or laser tracking to precisely hit designated targets. Unguided ordnance, commonly known as "dumb bombs," lack guidance systems and rely on the aircraft’s release parameters to strike a target. Though less accurate, unguided bombs are often used for area strikes and are more cost-effective.

== Air-to-ground ordnance ==
Air-to-ground or air-to-surface ordnance is a weapon that is fired or dropped from an aircraft to strike ground targets, such as the American Mk series bombs (Mk81, Mk82, Mk83 And Mk84), the American Paveway Series Guided bombs, the American AGM-65 series Guided Missiles, the Russian FAB series bombs (OFAB-100, FAB-250, FAB-500, FAB-1500, FAB-3000, FAB-5000, FAB-9000) or the Russian Kh series Guided Missiles,(Kh-22, Kh-23, Kh-25, Kh-29, Kh-32,Kh-38, Kh-55, Kh-58, Kh-69).

AGM missile systems use several main categories of guidance:

=== MCLOS ===
Manual command to line of sight (MCLOS or MACLOS) missiles are guided manually and remotely; the operator must simultaneously maintain a direct line of sight with both the missile and the target. Notable MCLOS guided missiles include:

- AGM-12 Bullpup

=== SACLOS ===
Semi-automatic command to line of sight (SACLOS) missiles are guided by pointing the targeting beam (usually projecting from the nose of the aircraft) at the target, then launching and continually pointing a sighting device at the target for the duration of the missile's flight. Both wire guidance and beam riding are types of SACLOS guidance. Notable SACLOS guided missiles include:

- BGM-71 TOW

=== Laser guidance ===
Laser-guided missiles are the most common types of missiles on helicopters and use a laser guidance system to guide the missile to its target. Notable laser-guided missiles include:

- AGM-114 Hellfire
- Kh-29

=== Television guidance ===
TV guidance originated in World War II and was common on American air-to-ground missiles from the 1980s to the early 2000s, but have mostly been replaced by better systems. Notable TV-guided missiles include:

- AGM-65 Maverick

=== Satellite guidance ===
GNSS-guided missiles use GPS to track targets, enabling fire-and-forget capability as the missile does not require manual input from the operator after launching. Aircraft usually use a targeting pod to lock onto targets. Notable GNSS-guided missiles include:

- Kh-38

=== Anti-radiation ===
Anti-radiation missiles or ARM track their targets' radio emissions. Notable anti-radiation missiles include:

- AGM-88 HARM

=== Infrared homing ===
IR-guided missiles, often referred to as "heatseekers" track heat signatures and are mostly used in an air-to-air capacity. Notable IR-guided missiles include:

- AGM-65 Maverick (E and F variants)

== Air-to-air ordnance ==
Air-to-air ordnance is a weapon fired from an aircraft to strike air targets, such as the Chinese PL series AAMs (PL-2, PL-5, PL-8, PL-9, PL-10, PL-11, PL-12, PL-15, PL-17, PL-21) or the French MICA series AAMs. There are several kinds of air-to-air missiles, most commonly identified using the "fox" (short for "foxtrot" identification system.

== See also ==
- List of aircraft weapons
- Strategic bombing during World War I
- Strategic bombing during World War I!
- Aerial bombing of cities
- Area bombing
- Airstrike

== Sources ==
- Buckley, J.D.; Buckley, J.J. (1999). Air Power in the Age of Total War. Indiana University Press. ISBN 978-0-253-21324-2.
