= List of NATO reporting names for air-to-surface missiles =

NATO reporting name for AS series air-to-surface missiles, with Soviet designations:

Note: The Soviet / Russian designation is a Cyrillic letter "Х", which is translated as "Kh" or "H". Also, sometimes a combination ("complex") of a missile with its aircraft is marked with a letter "K" (for example, a missile Kh-22 with an aircraft is a "complex K-22"). The Cyrillic "X" (read "Kh") in the designation of Soviet ASMs is in fact a Latin "X" ("ecks") for Xperimental, as used by the design bureau. With passing time, however, this was ignored and used in Soviet/Russian as well as foreign literature as the Cyrillic Kh.

== Soviet Union/Russia ==
- AS-1 "Kennel" (KS-1 Kometa)
- AS-2 "Kipper" (K-10S Yen)
- AS-3 "Kangaroo" (Kh-20)
- AS-4 "Kitchen" (Kh-22 Burya)
- AS-5 "Kelt" (Kh-11/KSR-2)
- AS-6 "Kingfish" (Kh-26/KSR-5)
- AS-7 "Kerry" (Kh-66, Kh-23 Grom)
- AS-8 (9M114V Shturm-V)
- AS-9 "Kyle" (Kh-28)
- AS-10 "Karen" (Kh-25)
- AS-11 "Kilter" (Kh-58 Izdeliye D-7)
- AS-12 "Kegler" (Kh-25MP, Kh-27PS)
- AS-13 "Kingbolt" (Kh-59 Ovod)
- AS-14 "Kedge" (Kh-29)
- AS-15 "Kent" (Kh-55/Kh-65S Izdeliye 120)
- AS-16 "Kickback" (Kh-15)
- AS-17 "Krypton" (Kh-31)
- AS-18 "Kazoo" (Kh-59M Ovod-M)
- AS-X-19 "Koala" (3M25A Meteorit-A)
- AS-20 "Kayak" (Kh-35/Kh-37 Uran)
- AS-X-21 (Kh-90 GELA)
- AS-22 "Kazoo" (Kh-59MK2 / Kh-69)
- AS-23 "Kodiak" (Kh-101 / Kh-102)
- AS-24 "Killjoy" (Kh-47M2 Kinzhal)

== China ==
- CH-AS-1 Kraken (YJ-61)
- CH-AS-5 Keystone
- CH-AS-X-13 (Air-launched DF-21D derivative)

== See also ==
- NATO reporting name
