= Tactical Missiles Corporation =

Russian Defense Company

- Native name: Russian: Акционерное общество Корпорация Тактическое Ракетное Вооружение
- Type: Joint-stock company
- Industry: Defense industry Aerospace industry Space industry
- Founded: January 24, 2002; 24 years ago
- Headquarters: Korolyov, Moscow Oblast, Russia
- Area served: worldwide
- Key people: Boris Viktorovich Obnosov (CEO)
- Products: Precision-guided munitions, Missiles, Ballistic missiles, Cruise missiles, Air-launched cruise missiles, Anti-aircraft missile systems, Anti-ship cruise missiles, Torpedoes, Underwater weapons, Aerial bombs, Glide bombs, Avionics, Electronics, Radars, Spacecraft, Unmanned aerial vehicles, Launch vehicles, Batteries
- Revenue: $2.58 billion (2016; 2018)
- Net income: $248 million (2016)
- Owner: Federal Agency for State Property Management (100%)
- Number of employees: 50,606 (2016; 2021)
- Website: www.ktrv.ru

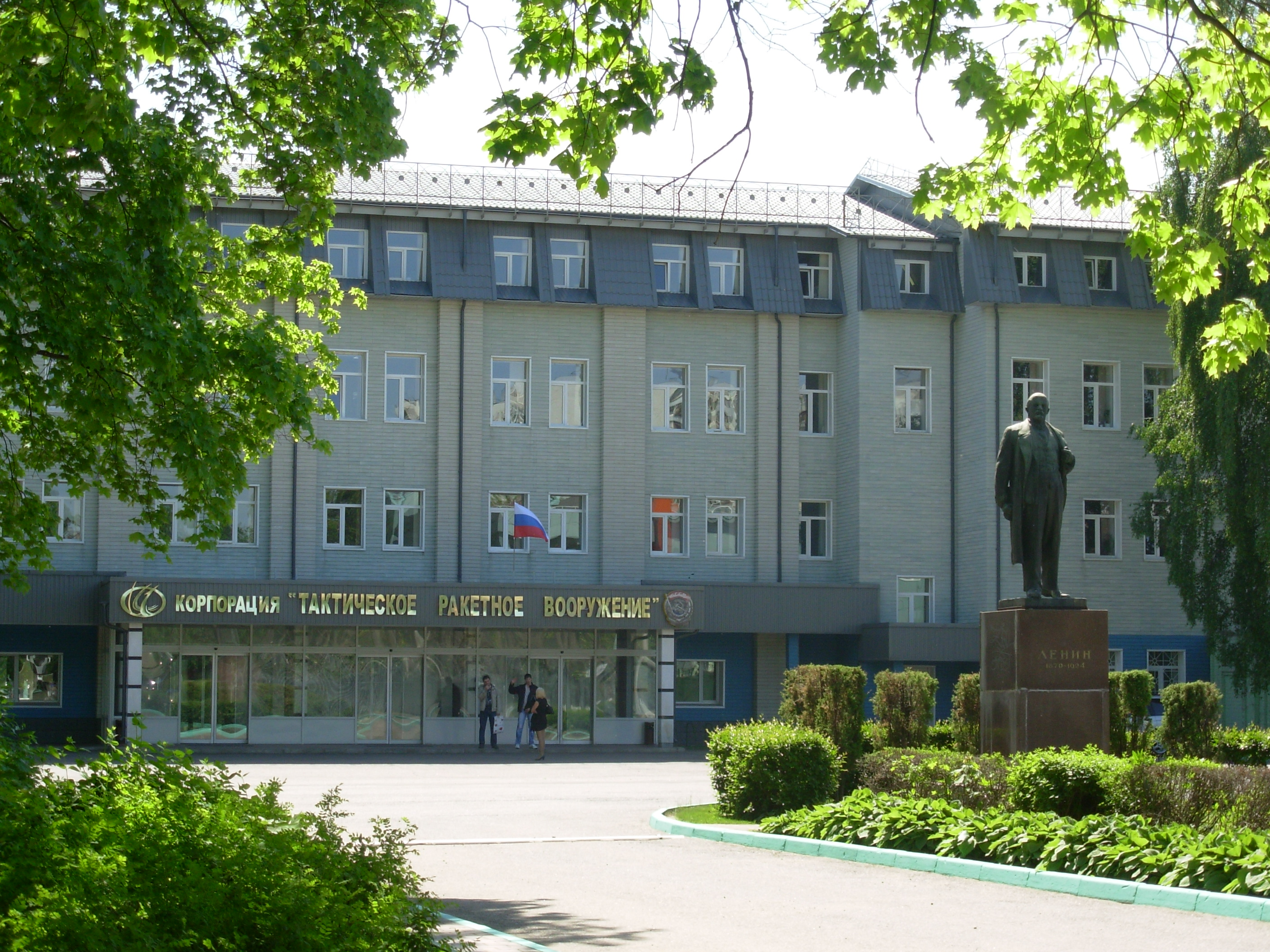
Tactical Missiles Corporation

JSC Tactical Missiles Corporation (KTRV) (Russian: АО «Корпорация Тактическое Ракетное Вооружение», КТРВ) is a major Russian holding company for the manufacturers of military weapons (especially missiles), headquartered in Korolyov, Moscow Oblast.

== History ==
Tactical Missiles Corporation was founded on the basis of Zvezda-Strela by the Decree of Russian president №84, signed on January 24, 2002.

Zvezda-Strela was a major designer and producer of military missile systems, and included the Zvezda Experimental Design Bureau (OKB), a serial production design bureau (SKB), the main Strela plant, and machine building plants in Kostroma and Bendery Moldova. It was formerly part of the missile-industry grouping Spetstekhnika (Special Equipment).

The structure of Tactical Missiles Corporation was expanded by subsequent decrees №591 on May 9, 2004 and №930 on July 20, 2007.

The holding is sanctioned by New Zealand in relation to the 2022 Russian invasion of Ukraine. Since April 8, 2022 the corporation has been included in the EU sanctions list. On February 24, 2022, the corporation was added to the sanctions list of Canada. On April 1, 2022 the corporation was included in the US sanctions lists for the purchase of products prohibited by export restrictions.

It was reported in September 2023 that the company had doubled the production of high precision weapons over the past six months. It was also reported in January 2024 that since February 2022 the company had increased the production of the most demanded high-precision weapons by 5 times.

== Structure ==
Structure of the holding:

- Vympel NPO
- MKB Raduga
- Region SSPE
- NPO Mashinostroyeniya
  - PO Strela
  - PZ Mashinostroitel
  - NPO Electromechanics
  - Avangard
  - UNIIKM
- Smolensk Aviation Plant
- Taganrog Krasny Gidropress Plant
- IBC Iskra
- PJSC Salute
- Turayevo ICD Soyuz
- Ural Design Bureau Detail
- Central Design Bureau of Automation
- ANPP TEMP AIR
- Azov optical-mechanical plant
- Research Institute of Machine Building
- RCH Globe
- SIC ASK
- Trading House Star - Boom
- 711 Aircraft Repair Plant
- Gidropribor
  - Plant Motor
  - Verhneufaleysky Uralelement
  - Research Institute of Maritime Thermal Technology
  - Dagdizel Plant
  - Electrodraught

== Missiles ==
- Kh-23 (AS-7 "Kerry")
- Kh-25 (AS-10 "Karen")
- Kh-27 (AS-12 "Kegler")
- Kh-29 (AS-14 "Kedge")
- Kh-31 (AS-17 "Krypton")
- Kh-35 (AS-20 "Kayak")
- Kh-38
- Kh-59
- Kh-69
- R-77
- R-27
- R-73
- R-33
- R-37
- LMUR (Izdelie 305)

== Torpedoes ==
- APR-3M
- VA-111 Shkval supercavitating torpedo

== Guided bombs ==
- UPAB 1500

== Owners and management ==
Rosimushchestvo owns 100% of the corporation's shares. The headquarters is located in Korolyov.

As of May 25, 2024 Boris Obnosov has been the General Director of KTRV since March 13, 2003.

== Financial indicators ==
In 2022 the net profit amounted to 456.6 million rubles.

== Awards ==
- Badge of Honour "For Success in Labour" (January 20, 2022) – for great contribution to the creation of new special equipment, strengthening the country's defense capability and high performance in production activities
