= Air-to-ground weaponry =

Aircraft ordnance

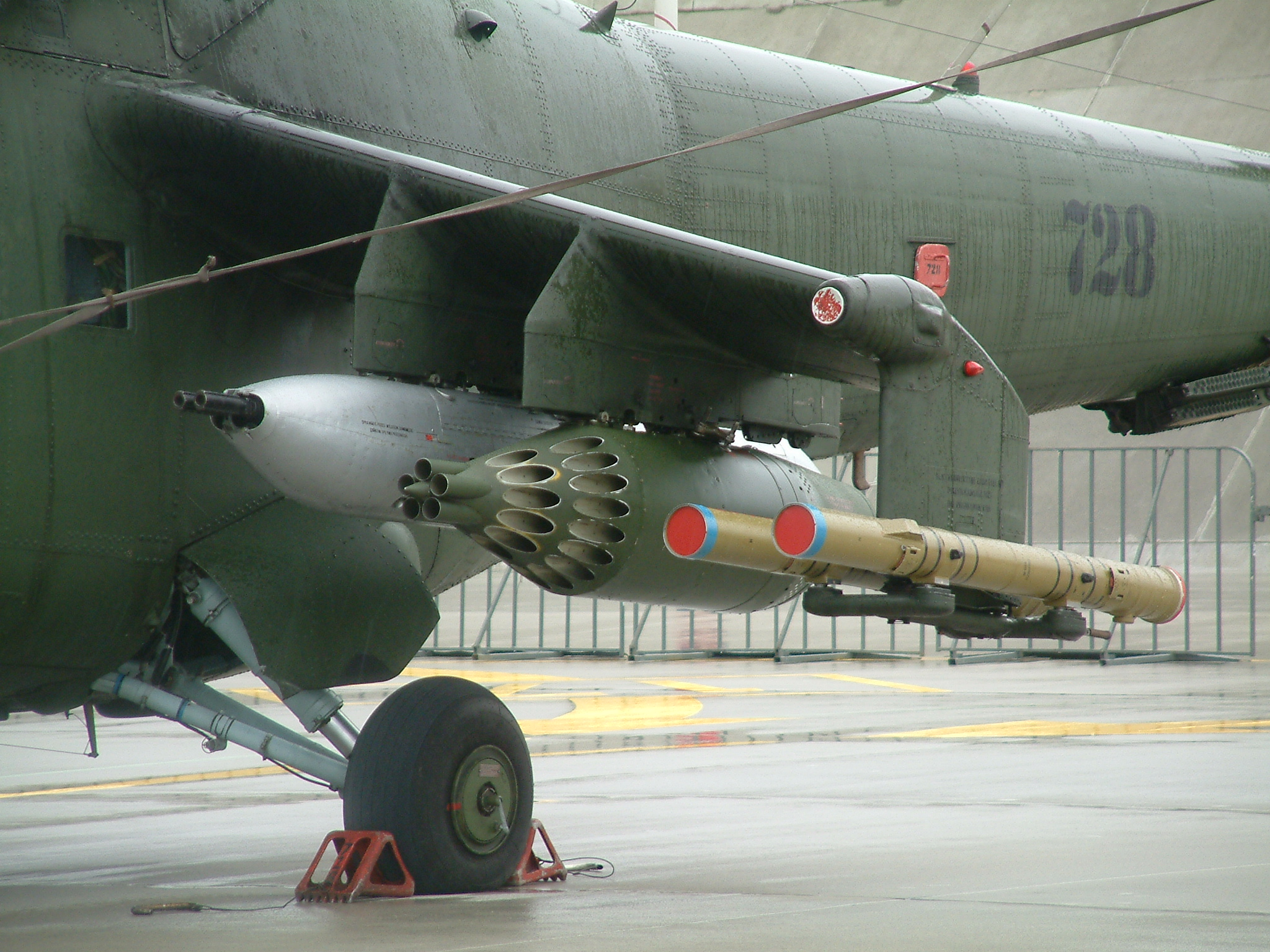
Autocannon pod (left), S-8 rocket pod (middle) and 9K114 Shturm anti-tank missile (right) mounted on the left wing of a Mi-24W helicopter of Polish Land Forces

Air-to-ground weaponry is aircraft ordnance used by combat aircraft to attack ground targets. The weapons include bombs, machine guns, autocannons, air-to-surface missiles, rockets, air-launched cruise missiles and grenade launchers.

== See also ==
- Aircraft ordnance
- Attack aircraft
- Gunship
- Close air support
