= Kh-38 =

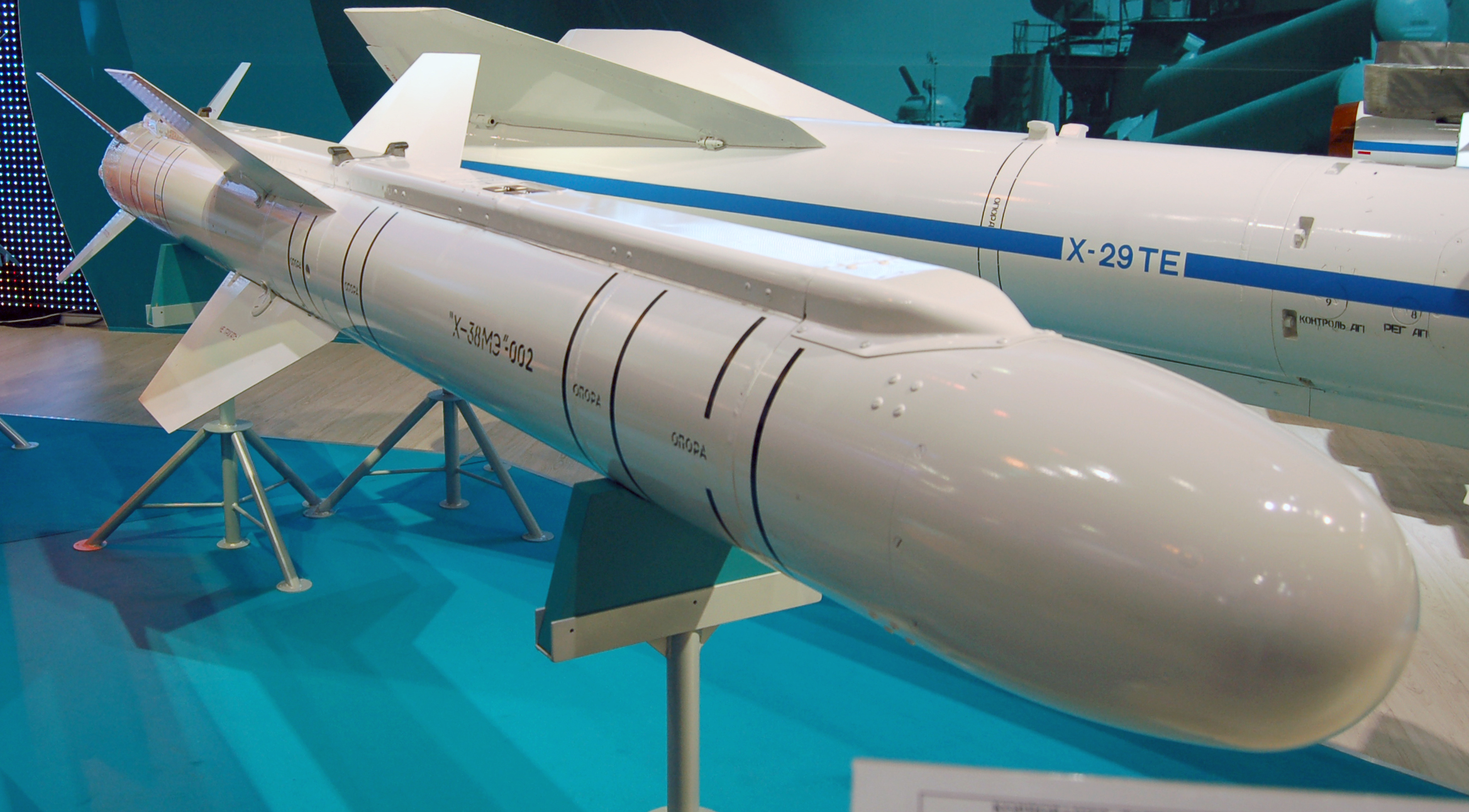
- Kh-38ME
- Type: Tactical air-to-surface missile
- Place of origin: Russia

Service history
- In service: 2012 (Kh-38ME); 2019 (Kh-36)
- Used by: Russia
- Wars: Syrian Civil War; Russo-Ukrainian War

Production history
- Designer: Tactical Missiles Corporation JSC
- Designed: 2007 (Kh-38ME) - 2015 (Kh-36)
- Manufacturer: Tactical Missiles Corporation JSC
- Produced: 2015 (Kh-38M) - 2019 (Kh-36)

Specifications
- Mass: 520 kg (1,150 lb)
- Length: 4.2 m (13 ft 9 in)
- Diameter: 0.31 m (12.2 in)
- Wingspan: 1.14 m (44.9 in)
- Warhead: HE fragmentation, cluster warhead, armor-piercing
- Warhead weight: up to 250 kg (551 lb)
- Detonation mechanism: Contact fuse
- Engine: Two-stage solid rocket motor
- Operational range: up to 70km (Kh-38ML), up to 120km (Kh-36 Grom-E1)
- Flight altitude: 200-12000 m
- Maximum speed: Mach 2.2
- Guidance system: Laser, active radar, IR, satellite, depending on variant
- Launch platform: Kh-38: Su-34, Su-25SM3, Su-57, Ka-52K, MiG-29K; Kh-36: Su-57, MiG-35

The Kh-38/Kh-38M (Russian: Х-38) is a family of standoff air-to-surface missiles meant to succeed the Kh-25 and Kh-29 missile families. The Kh-38 also serves as the basis for the Kh-36 unpowered and powered glide-bombs.

== Design and development ==

The basic configuration of the Kh-38M was revealed at the 2007 Moscow Air Show (MAKS). The first prototypes of the missile had initially folding wings and tail fins for internal carriage, and would have a variety of seeker heads for different variants. Different warheads (fragmentation, cluster munitions, penetrating) can also be fitted. The Kh-38M is meant to succeed the Kh-25 and Kh-29 missile families. It can be used by combat aircraft such as the Sukhoi Su-34 and Sukhoi Su-57, and it is planned to be integrated on the Kamov Ka-52K helicopter. The first test firing took place in 2010 from a Su-34, and production was ordered to start in 2015.

In a successive version, unveiled at MAKS 2017, both control surfaces were replaced by longer and narrower fixed ones, a solution similar to the one used in the Selenia Aspide missile.

== Operational history ==
The Kh-38M was first used in combat during the Russian military intervention in the Syrian civil war. It was also used during the 2022 invasion of Ukraine.

== Variants ==
=== Kh-38 ===
- Kh-38MA - inertial, active radar homing
- Kh-38MK - inertial, satellite guidance
- Kh-38ML - inertial, semi-active laser guidance
- Kh-38MT - inertial, imaging infrared guidance

=== Kh-36 ===
- Kh-36 Grom-E1 - Rocket assisted version of the Grom-E2. Sometimes referred as a hybrid missile glide bomb. AS-23 tactical cruise missile derivative/AGM with 120 km range
- Kh-36 Grom-E2 - AS-23B/KAB-type guided glide bomb with 50 km range.

Both versions of the Grom are of 600 kg weight, with various guidance mechanisms, and both are created on the basis of the Kh-38M short-range tactical missile and also have modular structures, warheads and seekers. This weapon was first seen at MAKS 2015, and intended to equip all types of fighters, including the MiG-35 and Su-57.

== See also ==
- Kh-25
- AGM-65 Maverick
- Brimstone
- FT-12
- Joint Air-to-Ground Missile
