= Vympel NPO =

Russian missile development and production company

Coordinates: 55.825°N 37.440°E

Vympel

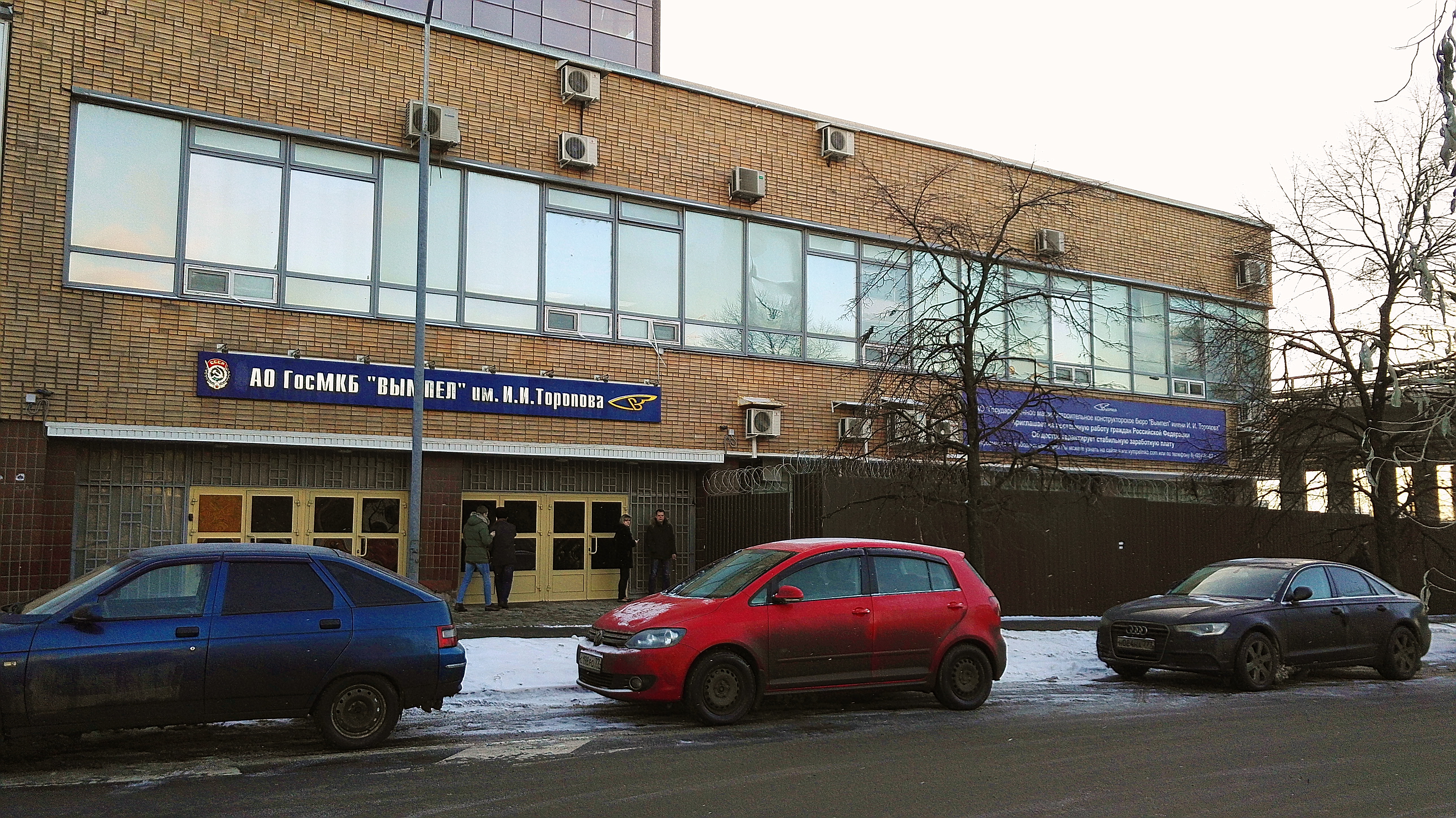
- Formerly: OKB-134
- Company type: Joint Stock Company
- Industry: Defence
- Founded: 1949
- Headquarters: Moscow, Russia
- Products: Missiles, Anti-ballistic missiles, Anti-aircraft missile systems
- Revenue: $649 million (2014)
- Parent: Tactical Missiles Corporation
- Website: vympelmkb.com

Vympel NPO is a Russian research and production company (NPO) based near Moscow, mostly known for their air-to-air missiles. Other projects include SAM and ABM defenses. It was started in the Soviet era as an OKB (experimental design bureau).

== History ==
Vympel started out after World War II as OKB-134, with Ivan I. Toropov leading the team. The first product they designed was the K-7 missile. Their first missile built in serial production was the K-13 (R-13) in 1958. Toropov moved to Tushino Aviation Facility in 1961 and was replaced by Andrey Lyapin. Somewhere between 1966 and 1968 the OKB got renamed to Vympel. In 1977, Matus Bisnovat of OKB-4 Molniya died, and all missile related work was passed to Vympel. G. Khokhlov led the team until 1981, when Genadiy A. Sokolovski succeeded him.

In 1992, the GosMKB Vympel got started on the basis of the OKB and in 1994 Sokolovski became the director of development at the company.

In May 2004, the Tactical Missiles Corporation was formed and Vympel became a part of it, as the design and development facility.

== Notable projects ==
=== Air-to-air missiles ===
- K-13/R-13 (AA-2 "Atoll")
- R-4 (AA-5 "Ash")
- R-23/R-24 (AA-7 "Apex")
- R-27 (AA-10 "Alamo")
- R-33 (AA-9 "Amos")
- R-37 (AA-13 "Axehead")
- R-40 (AA-6 'Acrid')
- R-60 (AA-8 "Aphid")
- R-73 (AA-11 "Archer")
- R-77 (AA-12 "Adder")

=== Air-to-surface missiles ===
- Kh-29 (AS-13 "Kedge")
- Terra-3 laser

=== Surface-to-air missiles ===
- 3M9 SA missile (SA-6 "Gainful") for Kub missile system.
- ABM-1 Galosh
