= Kh-59 =

Russian cruise missile

Kh-59 Ovod (NATO reporting name: AS-13 'Kingbolt') Kh-59M Ovod-M (AS-18 'Kazoo')
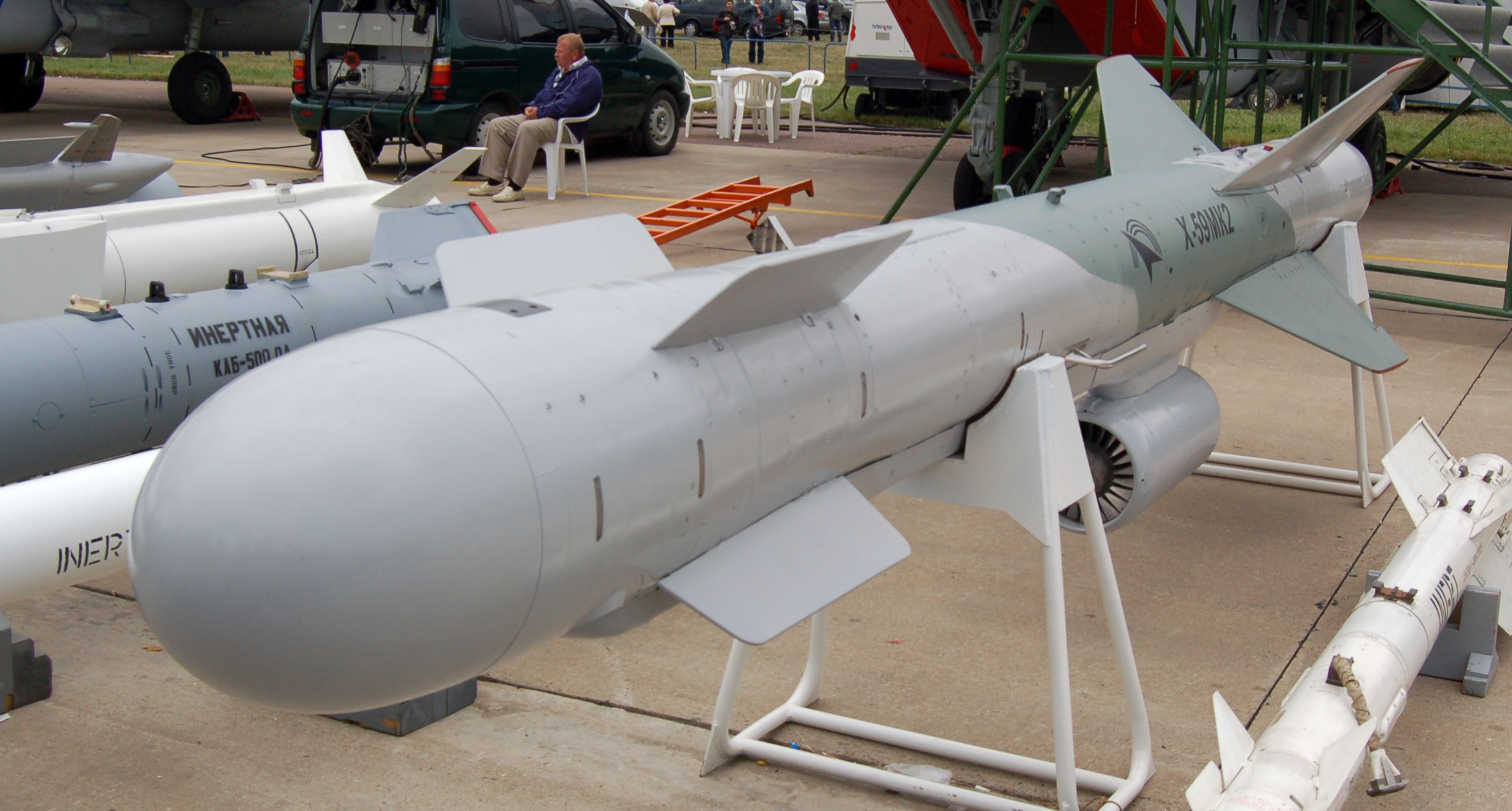
- Kh-59MK at MAKS 2009 air show
- Type: Cruise missile Air-launched cruise missile Air-to-surface missile Anti-ship missile Land-attack missile
- Place of origin: Soviet Union/Russia

Service history
- In service: 1980–current
- Used by: Russia, China, India, Algeria
- Wars: First Chechen War; Second Chechen War; Russo-Ukrainian War

Production history
- Designer: MKB Raduga
- Manufacturer: Tactical Missiles Corporation

Specifications
- Mass: 930 kg (2,050 lb)
- Length: 570 cm (220 in)
- Diameter: 38.0 cm (15.0 in)
- Wingspan: 130 cm (51.2 in)
- Warhead: Cluster or shaped-charge fragmentation
- Warhead weight: 320 kg (705 lb)
- Engine: Kh-59: two-stage rocket Kh-59ME: rocket then R95TP-300 turbojet/turbofan
- Operational range: Kh-59ME (export): 115 km (62 nmi); Kh-59ME: 200 km (110 nmi); Kh-59MK: 285 km (150 nmi); Kh-59MK2: 290 km (160 nmi)
- Maximum speed: Mach 0.72 – Mach 0.88 (882–1,080 km/h; 548–670 mph)
- Guidance system: Inertial guidance (then TV guidance), millimeter wave active radar homing (Kh-59MK, Kh-59MK2 land attack version)
- Launch platform: Kh-59ME: Su-30MK; Kh-59: Su-24M, MiG-27, Su-17M3/22M4, HAL Tejas, Su-30 MKI Su-25 and Su-30; Kh-59MK2: Su-57

The Kh-59 Ovod (Russian: Х-59 Овод 'Gadfly'; AS-13 'Kingbolt') is a Russian air-launched cruise missile with a two-stage solid-fuel propulsion system and 200 km (120 mi) range. The Kh-59M Ovod-M (AS-18 'Kazoo') is a variant with a bigger warhead and turbojet engine. It is primarily a land-attack missile; the Kh-59MK variant targets ships.

== Development ==
The initial design was based on the Raduga Kh-58 (AS-11 'Kilter'), but it had to be abandoned because the missile speed was too high for visual target acquisition.

Raduga OKB developed the Kh-59 in the 1970s as a longer ranged version of the Kh-25 (AS-10 'Karen'), as a precision stand-off weapon for the Su-24M and late-model MiG-27's. The electro-optical sensors for this and other weapons such as the Kh-29 (AS-14 'Kedge') and KAB-500KR bombs were developed by S. A. Zverev NPO in Krasnogorsk.

It is believed that development of the Kh-59M started in the 1980s. Details of the Kh-59M were first revealed in the early 1990s.

== Design ==
The basic Kh-59 model is released from the carrier plane, after which the first stage fires, a solid fuel accelerator in the tail. Now the stabilizers located in the front of the missile unfold, with wings and rudder in the rear. Driven by the second stage cruise rocket engine, the Kh-59 cruises at an altitude of about 7 metres above water or 100–1,000 metres (330–3,280 ft) above ground with the help of a radar altimeter. It can be launched at speeds of 600 to 1,000 km/h (370 to 620 mph) at altitudes of 0.2 to 11 kilometres (660 to 36,090 ft) and has a CEP of 2 to 3 metres (7 to 10 ft). It is carried on an AKU-58-1 launch pylon.

The Kh-59ME has an external turbofan engine below the body just forward of the rear wings, but retains the powder-fuel accelerator. It also has a dual guidance system consisting of an inertial guidance system to guide it into the target area and a television system to guide it to the target itself.

The 36MT turbofan engine developed for the Kh-59M class of missiles is manufactured by NPO Saturn of Russia.

Target coordinates are fed into the missile before launch, and the initial flight phase is conducted under inertial guidance. At a distance of 10 km (6.2 mi) from the target the television guidance system is activated. An operator aboard the aircraft visually identifies the target and locks the missile onto it.

== Operational history ==
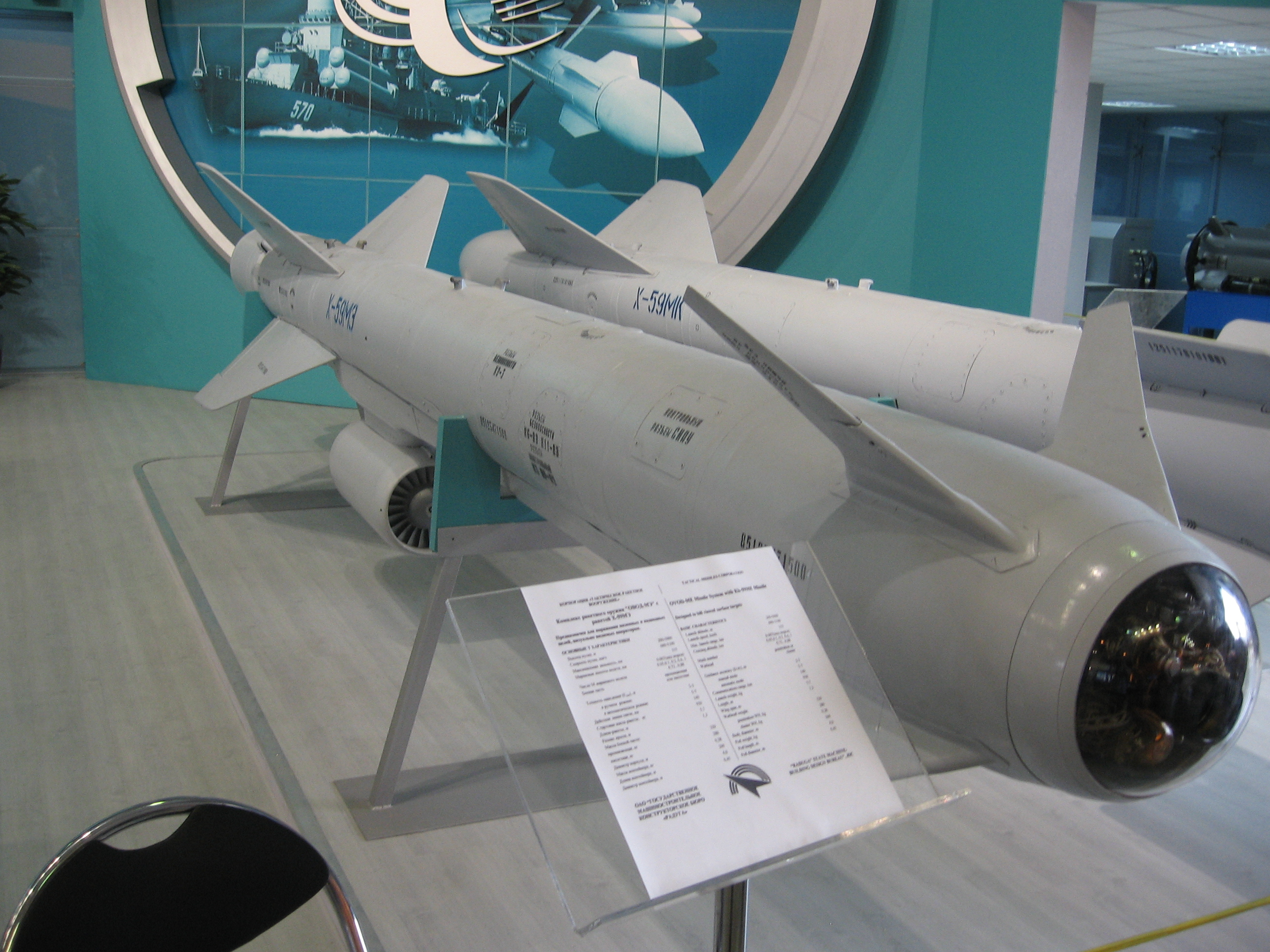
Kh-59ME

Although the original Kh-59 could be carried by the MiG-27, Su-17M3, Su-22M4, Su-24M, Su-25 and Su-30 family if they carried an APK-9 datalink pod, it was only fielded on the Su-24M in Russian service. From 2008–2015, Russia delivered some 200 Kh-59 missiles to China for use on the Su-30MK2; deliveries may have included both Kh-59MK and Kh-59MK2 versions. The Kh-59MK2 has been test-fired by a Su-57 stealth fighter, during its 2018 Syrian deployment.

On 4 April 2022, during the Russian invasion of Ukraine, photographic evidence was published on Telegram channels that a Kh-59M missile was launched by the Russian Aerospace Forces at a grain silo near Mykolaiv, Ukraine. The missile was captured on CCTV as it was traveling to the target area.

On 16 August 2022, the Ukrainian Air Force confirmed over social media that Kh-59 missiles were used to strike an airbase in the Zhytomyr Oblast, the missiles being fired towards the Belarusian border from what was believed to be Su-34 jets.

== Variants ==
=== Kh-59 model ===
- Kh-59 (AS-13 'Kingbolt') – original version with dual solid-fuel rocket engines. First shown in 1991; exported as Kh-59 or Kh-59E.
- Kh-59M (AS-18 'Kazoo') – adds turbojet engine and larger warhead. Range 115 km.
- Kh-59ME – 200 km-range variant offered for export in 1999.
- Kh-59MK – 285 km-range anti-shipping variant with turbofan engine and ARGS-59 active radar seeker.
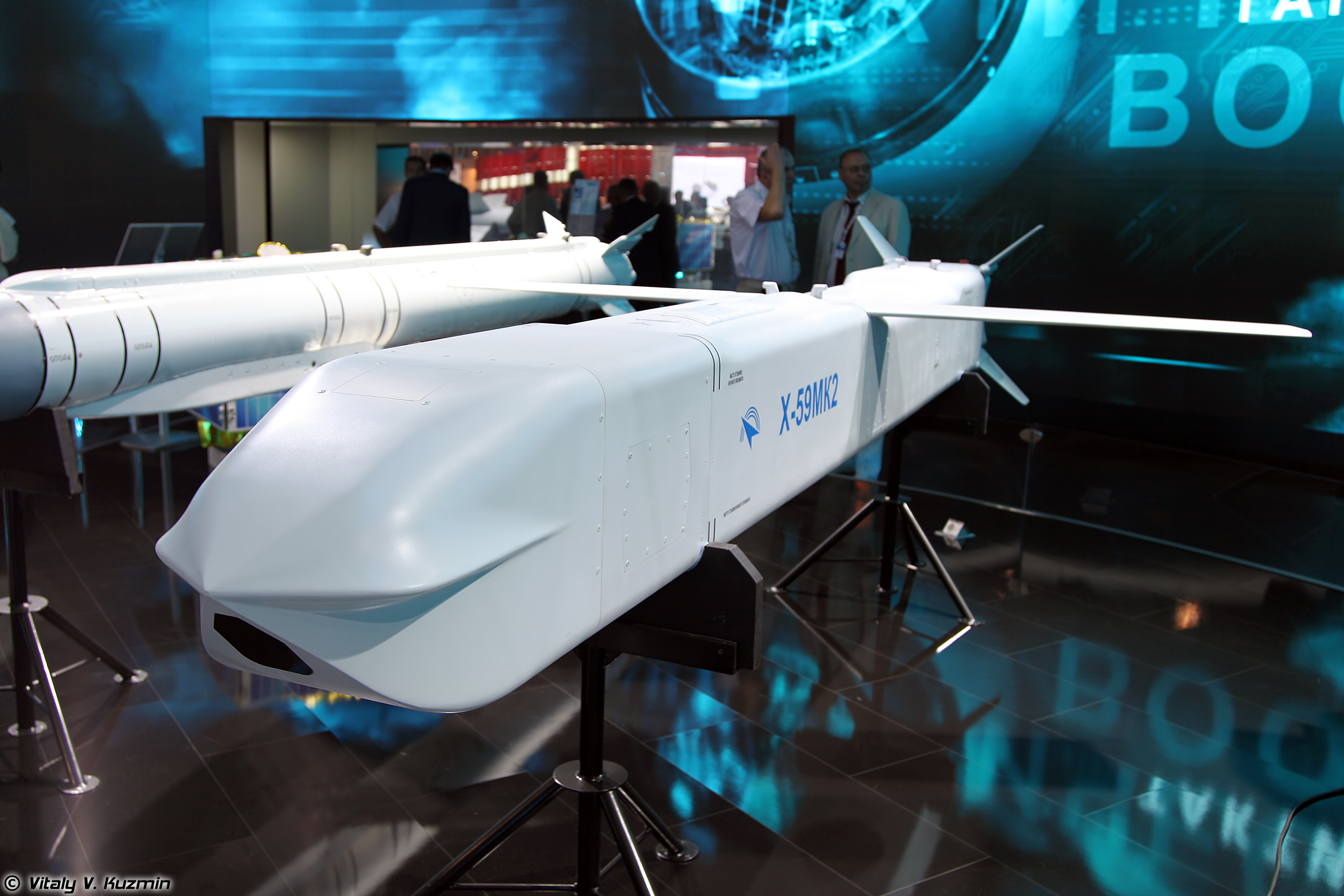
  The stealthy Kh-59MK2
- Kh-59MK2 (AS-22) –low observable land attack variant of Kh-59MK (fire-and-forget), equipped with either a 320 kg penetrating or 285 kg (628 lb) pellet warhead. First unveiled at MAKS 2015.
- Kh-59M2 – Kh-59M/Kh-59MK with new TV/IIR seekers, reported in 2004.
- Kh-20 – possible name for nuclear-tipped variant carried by Su-27 family.
- Kh-59L – laser-guided variant that was developed.
- Kh-59T – TV guided instead of laser guidance variant.
- Kh-59MKM – penetrator version that eliminated the seeker section and fitted a 360 kg (790 lb) warhead, able to penetrate 3 m of reinforced concrete.

Proposed development options for the Kh-59M/ME have included alternative payloads (including cluster munitions) but their current development status is unclear.

== Operators ==
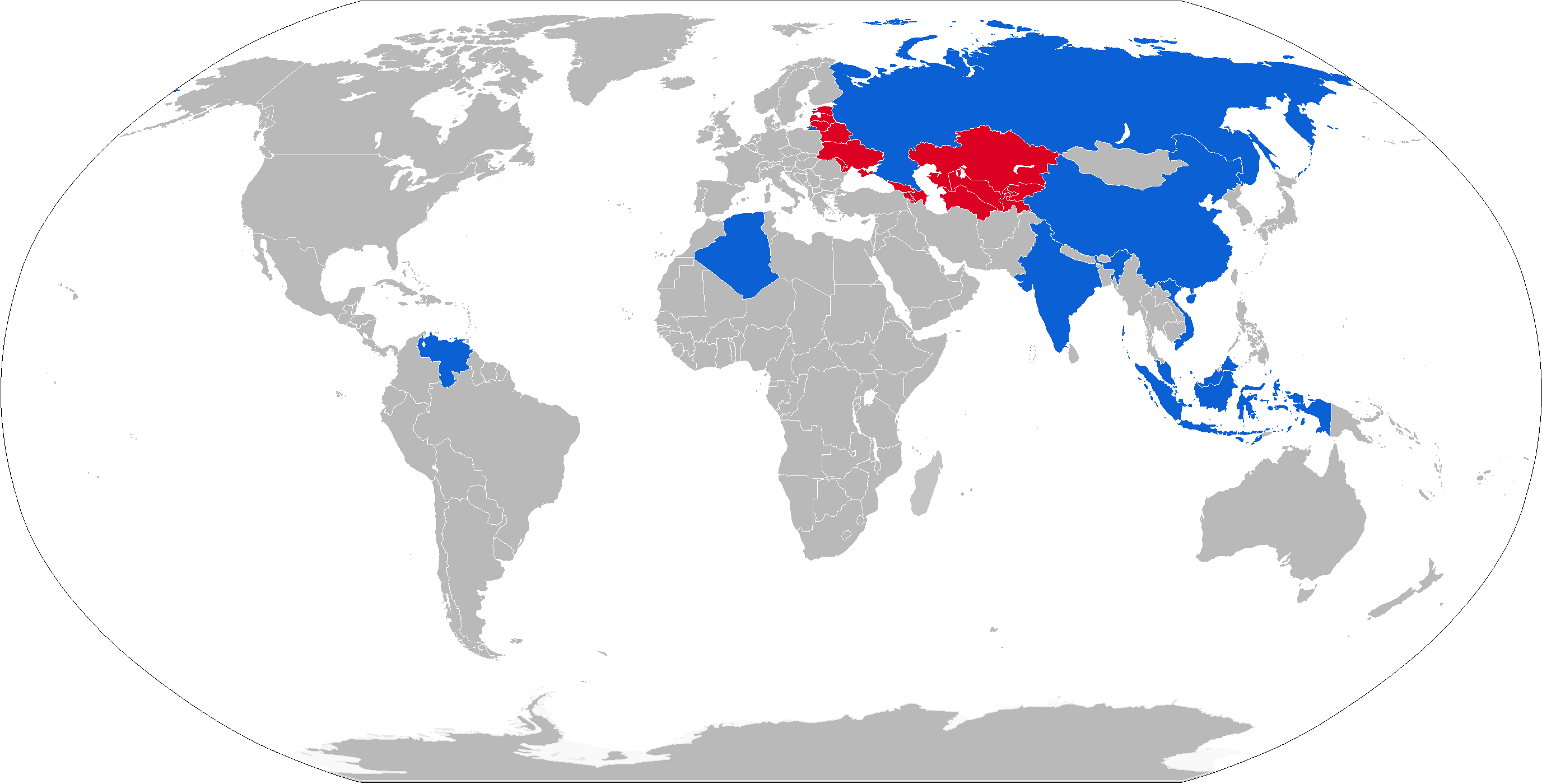
Map with Kh-59 operators in blue and former operators in red

=== Current operators ===
Algeria

- Algerian Air Force

China

- People's Liberation Army Air Force

India

- Indian Air Force

Indonesia

- Indonesian Air Force

Malaysia

- Royal Malaysian Air Force

Russia

- Russian Aerospace Forces

Syria

- Syrian Air Force

Venezuela

- Venezuelan Air Force

Vietnam

- Vietnam People's Air Force

=== Former operators ===
Soviet Union

- Soviet Air Forces

== See also ==
- Kh-69 – (Russia) next generation, long range & stealth missile
- AGM-130 – (United States) TV-guided penetration missile
- AGM-84E Standoff Land Attack Missile – (United States)
- AGM-62 Walleye – (United States) II – TV-guided glide bomb with 83 km range
- Kh-37 variant of Kh-35 – (Russia) U (AS-20 'Kayak') – 145 kg warhead, 250 km range
- Kh-58 – (Soviet Union) (AS-11 'Kilter') – Raduga anti-radar missile, 120 km range
- Kh-35 – (Russia) (AS-20 'Kayak')

== Bibliography ==
- Gordon, Yefim (2004). Soviet/Russian Aircraft Weapons: Since World War Two. Hinckley, England: Midland Publishing. ISBN 1-85780-188-1.
