= Kh-23 Grom =

Kh-66/Kh-23 Grom (NATO reporting name: AS-7 'Kerry')
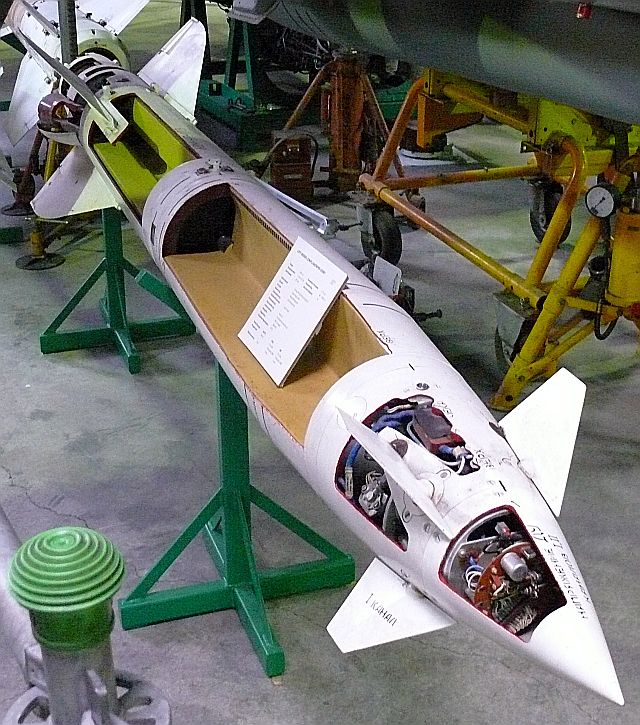
- AS-7 'Kerry'
- Type: Tactical air-to-surface missile
- Place of origin: Soviet Union

Service history
- In service: Kh-66 :20 June 1968; Kh-23 :1973; Kh-23M :1974
- Used by: FSU, Warsaw Pact, Iraq, India

Production history
- Designer: Yurii N. Korolyov
- Manufacturer: Zvezda-Strela

Specifications
- Mass: A921 :287 kg (633 lb)
- Length: A921 :3.525 m (11 ft 7 in)
- Diameter: 27.5 cm (10.8 in)
- Wingspan: 78.5 cm (2 ft 6.9 in)
- Warhead weight: 111 kg (245 lb)
- Engine: Solid fuel rocket
- Operational range: 2–10 km (1.1–5.4 nmi)
- Maximum speed: 2,160–2,700 km/h (1,340–1,680 mph)
- Guidance system: Kh-66: Line-Of-Sight Beam riding Kh-23: Radio command guidance Grom-B: TV guidance
- Launch platform: Yak-38, MiG-21PFM, MiG-23, MiG-27, Su-17M3/20/22/22M3/M4,

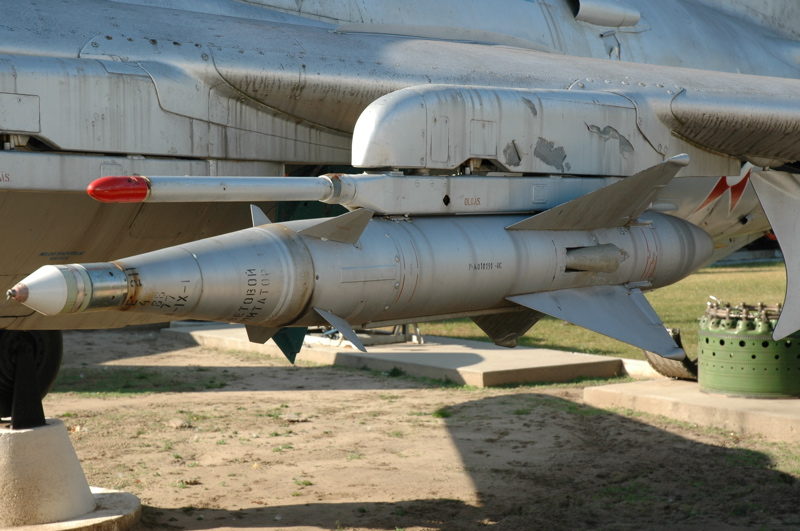
K-5M (AA-1 'Alkali') air-to-air missile, ancestor of the Kh-66

The Zvezda Kh-66 and Kh-23 Grom (Russian: Х-23 Гром 'Thunder'; NATO: AS-7 'Kerry') are a family of early Soviet tactical air-to-surface missiles with a range of 10 km. They were intended for use against small ground or naval targets. The Kh-66 was effectively a heavy-warhead, beam-riding version of the K-8 (AA-3 'Anab') air-to-air missile rushed into service in Vietnam in 1968. The Kh-23 was an improved Kh-66 with command-guidance, similar to the AGM-12 Bullpup.

== Development ==
Work on air-to-air missiles had started at the Kaliningrad Engineering Plant (then known as Plant #455, and later merged into Zvezda-Strela) in 1955. This had resulted in the Kaliningrad K-5 (AA-1 'Alkali') family of beam-guided missiles, including the K-51 (RS-2-US) carried by the Su-9 'Fishpot'. OKB-4 Molniya (later Vympel NPO) under Matus Bisnovat would go on to produce missiles such as the AA-6 Acrid. Meanwhile, in 1963 the RS-2-US was tested as an air-to-surface missile. It was concluded that the small warhead and inaccurate guidance made such an application "pointless".

However, in 1965 North Vietnam requested an air-to-surface missile from the Soviet government; the AGM-12 Bullpup had entered service with the US Air Force before the start of the Vietnam War. In April 1965 OKB-134 (later NPO Vympel) started work on this missile under the project name Kh-23, but they had problems developing a guidance system that would work with existing aircraft. As a result, Yurii N. Korolyov came up with his own proposals based on the earlier experiments with the RS-2-US. A design bureau to develop the RS-2-US for surface targets was set up under Korolyov by decree #100 of 12 March 1966 of the Ministry of the Aircraft Industry; this bureau would become the Zvezda OKB in 1976.

The resulting weapon used the body of a K-8 (AA-3 'Anab'), K-5 guidance and propulsion systems, but increased the warhead from 13 kg (29 lb) to 100 kg (220 lb). This had the big advantage of allowing the new weapon to be fitted to any aircraft capable of firing the K-5. Design began in 1966, so the project was known as Kh-66 or Izdeliye 66 ('Article 66'). The Kh-66 was a beam-riding weapon that was first tested on the MiG-21PFM, with the first launches of the missile in September 1966. It entered production in 1968 for that aircraft. The Kh-66 was only an interim solution as it required the launch aircraft to dive towards the target to maintain lock on the target. It entered service on 20 June 1968.The reason it was only carried on the MIG-21PFM was, since it was a beam-riding missile, it was paired with a radar, the RP-21M, which other aircraft did not have.

Meanwhile, Korolyov took over work on the Kh-23 project intended for carriage on the Soviet Union's new MiG-23. The Kh-23 became a development of the Kh-66 design with an improved propellant and new Delta-R1M guidance system. The main practical difference was that it was a line-of-sight radio-command weapon similar to the Bullpup, allowing it to be fired in level flight (unlike the Kh-66). The first ten were tested in early 1968, but significant delays were caused by problems with unreliable guidance which was eventually traced to the smoke generator which interfered with the antenna. Once the receiver had been moved to a tail extension, the government tested the missile on the MiG-23 and MiG-23B between 20 March 1970 and 3 October 1973. and it entered service in 1973. A laser-guided version of the Kh-23, the Kh-25, became the basis for the AS-10 'Karen' family of missiles. Technology from these was 'backported' to the Kh-23 to create the Kh-23M in 1974.

The Kh-23 was later licensed for local production in both Romania and Yugoslavia. In 1977 a dummy Kh-23 was fired from a Ka-252TB helicopter, the prototype of the Kamov Ka-29TB 'Helix-B' assault transport.

== Design ==
The Kh-66 used the airframe of the Kaliningrad K-8 (AA-3 'Anab') air-to-air missile, with the nozzle split to make room for the antenna of the beam-riding guidance system of the Kaliningrad K-5 (AA-1 'Alkali'). It has cruciform control fins on the nose, and four clipped-tip delta-wings at the rear with elevators for control.

== Operational history ==
The Kh-66 entered production for the MiG-21 in 1968, and the Kh-23 was certified for the MiG-23 'Flogger' in 1973.

== Variants ==
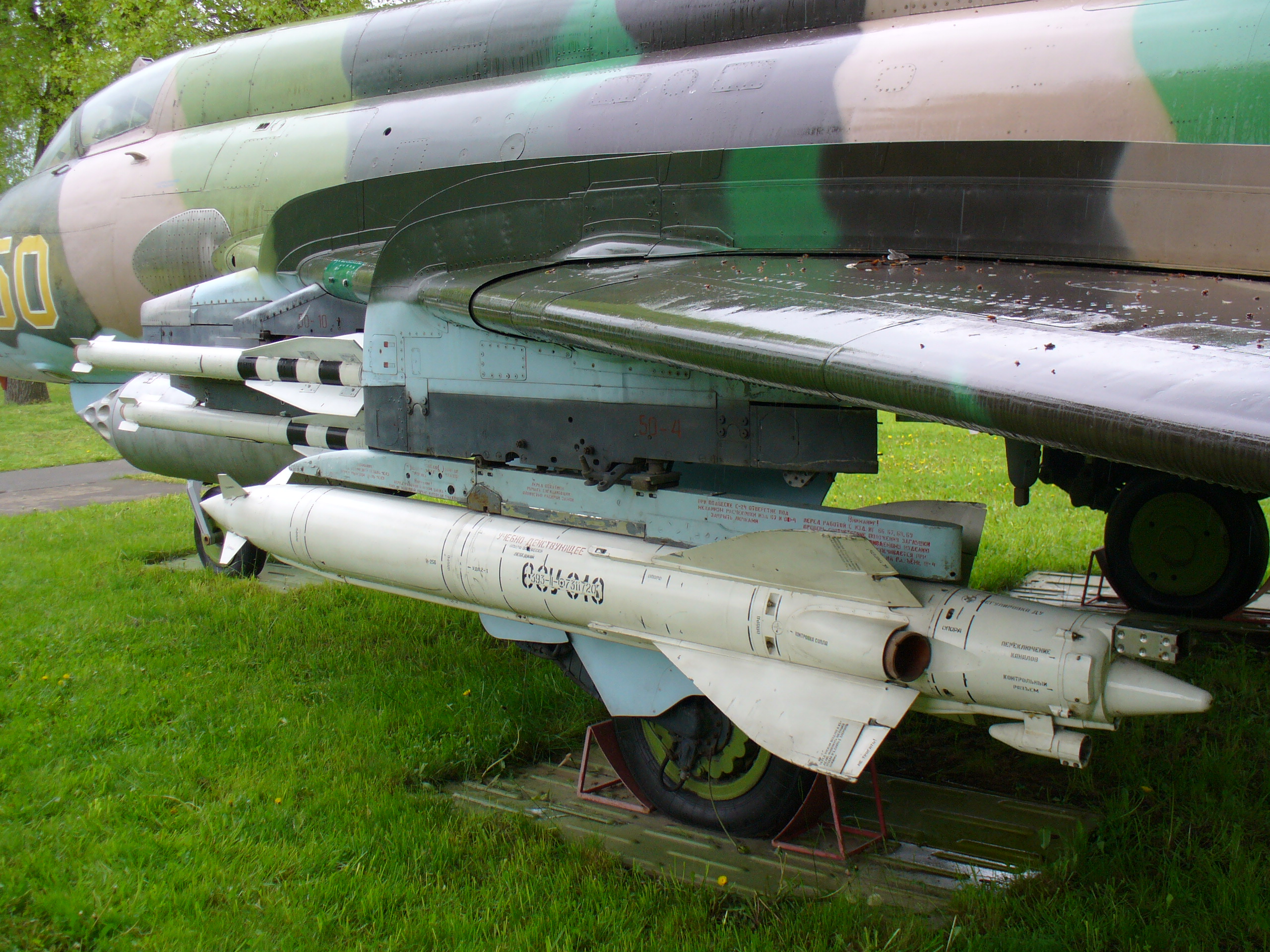
Sukhoi Su-17M3 with a Kh-23 missile

- Kh-66 - the original beam-riding missile based on the K-8
- Kh-23 (Izdeliye 68) - First command-guidance version with improved propellant
- Kh-23M - improved Kh-23 with technology from the Kh-25 family
- Kh-23L - Western name for a laser-guided version that in fact was the baseline Kh-25 (AS-10 'Karen')
- A921 - Version made in Romania
- Grom (Grom 02) - Yugoslav version that appeared in the 1980s. This should not be confused with the Polish SAM
- Grom-B (Grom 2) - TV-guided version from Serbia's Military Technical Institute in the mid-late 1990s; uses seeker based on that of the AGM-65B Maverick

== Operators ==
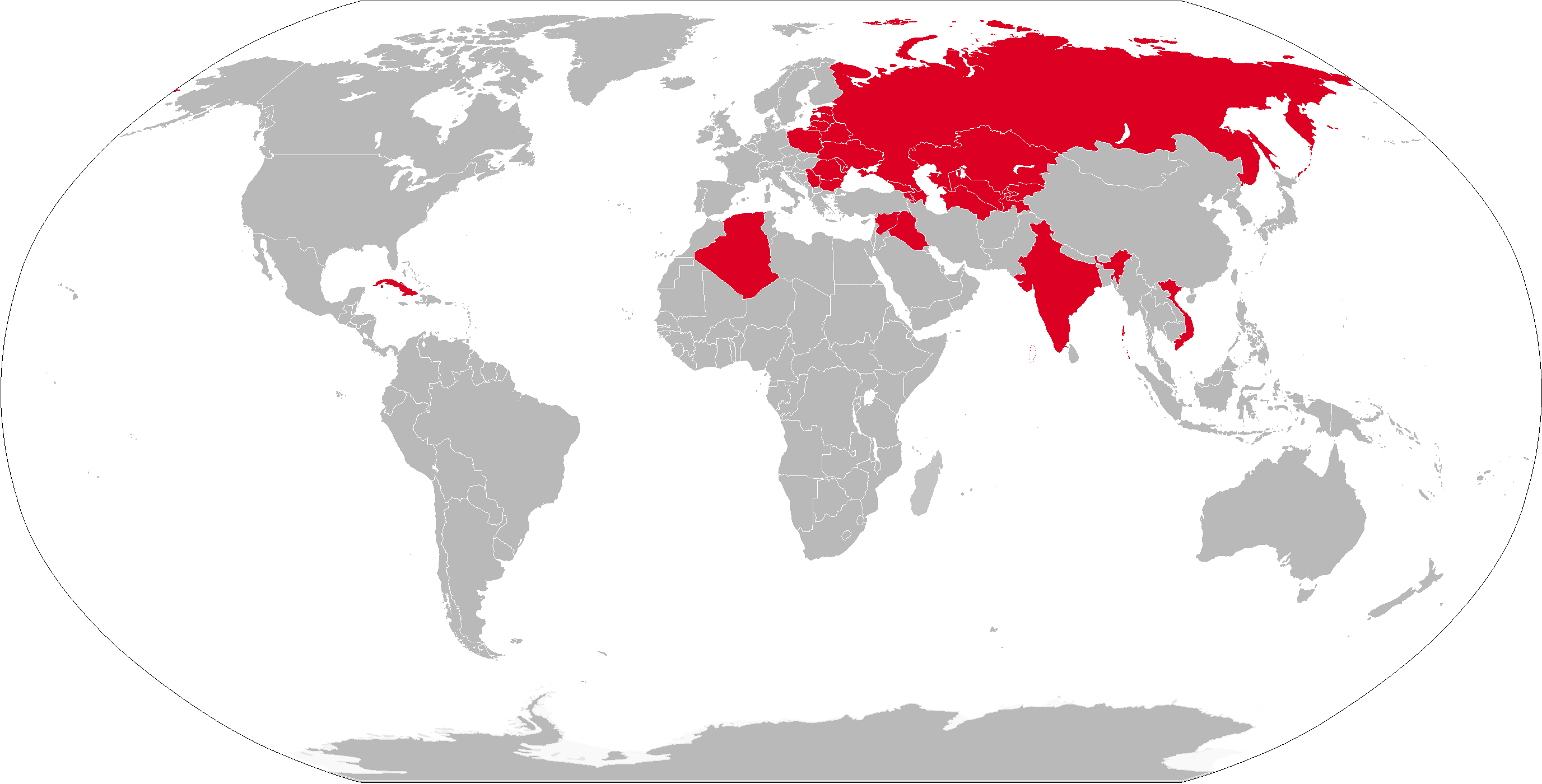
Map with former Kh-23 operators in red

=== Current ===
- North Korea

=== Former ===
- Afghanistan
- Algeria
- Angola
- Azerbaijan
- Belarus
- Bulgaria
- Cambodia
- Congo
- Cuba
- Czechoslovakia − Passed on to successor states
- Czech Republic
- East Germany − Passed on to the unified German state
- Egypt
- Finland
- Georgia
- Germany
- Hungary
- India
- Iraq
- Kazakhstan
- Libya
- Nigeria
- Poland
- Romania − Locally produced as the A-921
- Serbia −Grom
- Slovakia
- Soviet Union − passed on to successor states
- Sudan
- Syria
- Ukraine
- Vietnam
- Yugoslavia − Passed on to successor states

== Similar weapons ==
- AGM-12 Bullpup
- AS-20 - French air-to-ground missile based on an early air-to-air missile
