= Kh-69 =

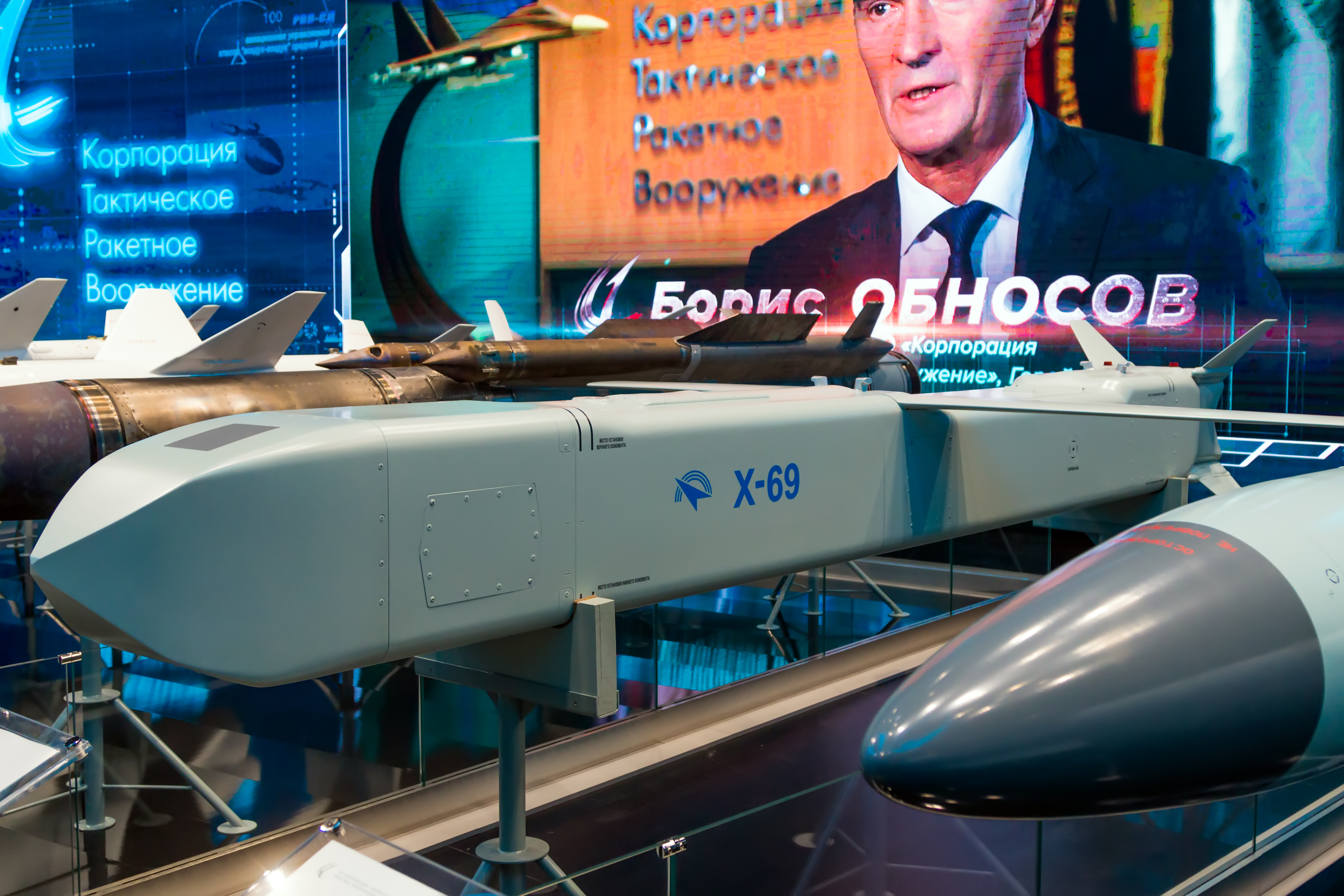
- A mock-up Kh-69 at Army 2022.
- Type: Air-launched cruise missile
- Place of origin: Russia

Service history
- In service: 2023–current
- Used by: Russia
- Wars: Russo-Ukrainian War

Production history
- Designer: MKB Raduga
- Manufacturer: Tactical Missiles Corporation

Specifications
- Mass: 800 kg (1,800 lb)
- Warhead weight: 300 kg (660 lb)
- Engine: TURBOFAN
- Operational range: 400 km (250 mi)
- Maximum speed: up to 1,000 km/h (620 mph)
- Guidance system: GNSS, INS and Contrast seeker
- Launch platform: Su-30MK, Su-34, Su-35, Su-57, MiG-29K, MiG-35

The Kh-69 (Cyrillic: Х-69) (NATO reporting name: AS-22 'Kazoo') is a Russian stealth subsonic air-launched cruise missile. It was developed from the Kh-59 missile, and has a range of at least 400 km (250 mi). It has a reduced radar signature compared to its forerunners.

== History ==
The Kh-69 is a product of the Tactical Missile Corporation subsidiary MKB Raduga. It was first unveiled in August 2022.

In September 2023, the International Institute for Strategic Studies reported that the Kh-69 was still in the testing phase of development.

Claims have been made that three Kh-69s were fired at Ukraine overnight on 7-8 February 2024.

On 11 April 2024, Ukrainian sources claimed debris of a Kh-69 missile were found on the site of Russian missile attack against the Trypilska thermal power plant, which was completely disabled as a result of the attack. The attack "destroyed the transformer, turbines and generators" of the power plant. The Institute for the Study of War characterized the attack as part of "continued efforts to improve strike packages and penetrate Ukraine's degraded air defense."

In 2024, Russia's Tactical Missiles Corporation and MKB Raduga introduced the stealth cruise missile, Kh-69, to the Indian Air Force representatives as a state-of-the-art strike power for the Indian Air Force's Sukhoi-30MKI.

== Technical characteristics ==
The Kh-69 can be carried inside the Sukhoi Su-57's internal weapons bays. It can also be used by the Su-30MK, Su-34, Su-35, MiG-29K and MiG-35.

The missile is similar in appearance to the Storm Shadow and Taurus KEPD 350 missiles. It has one pair of wings and four fins at the rear, that all deploy in flight after launch.

The missile is reported to weigh under 800 kg (1,800 lb) and is reported to cruise at speeds of up to 1,000 km/h (620 mph). It can use either a cluster or a penetration warhead, weighing around 300 kilograms (660 lb).

The Kh-69 uses GPS and GLONASS for guidance, with inertial backup. The missile is reportedly able to fly at an altitude as low as 20 meters above ground level, which greatly contributes to its low radar observability. An electro-optical seeker was reported in 2022 to round out the sensor suite.

== Gallery ==
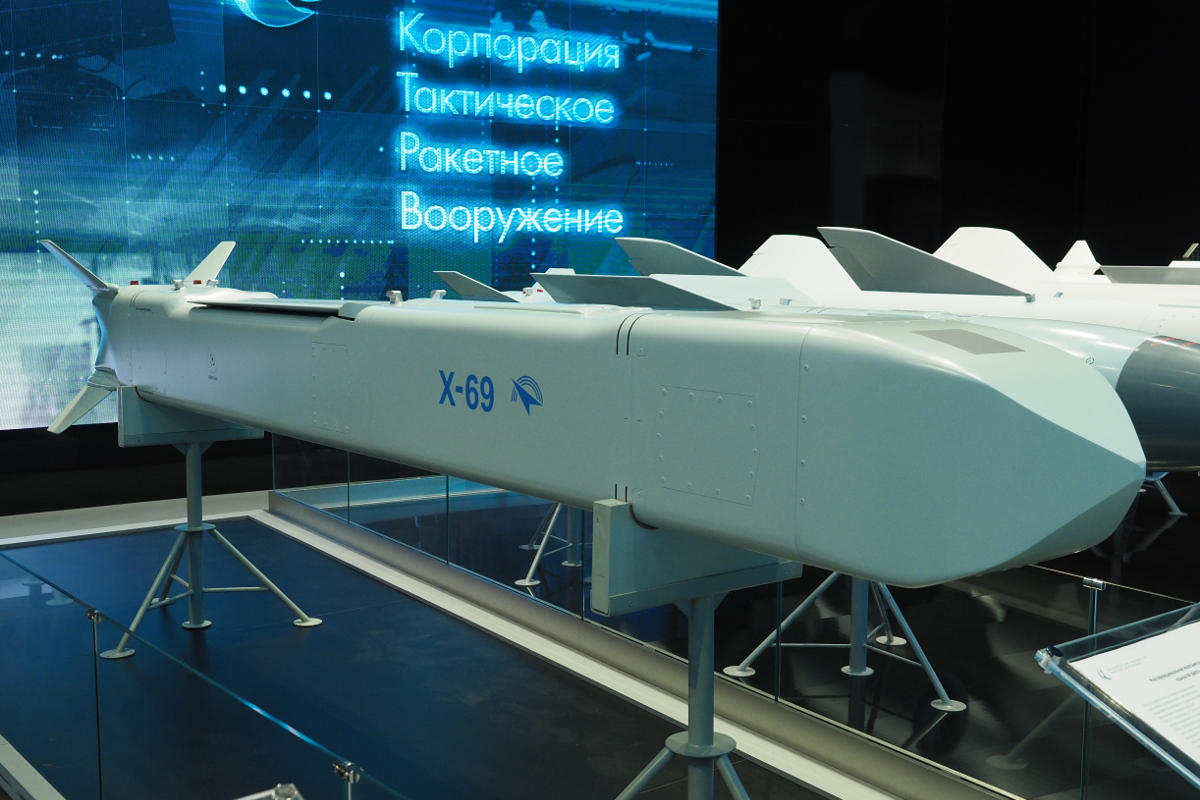

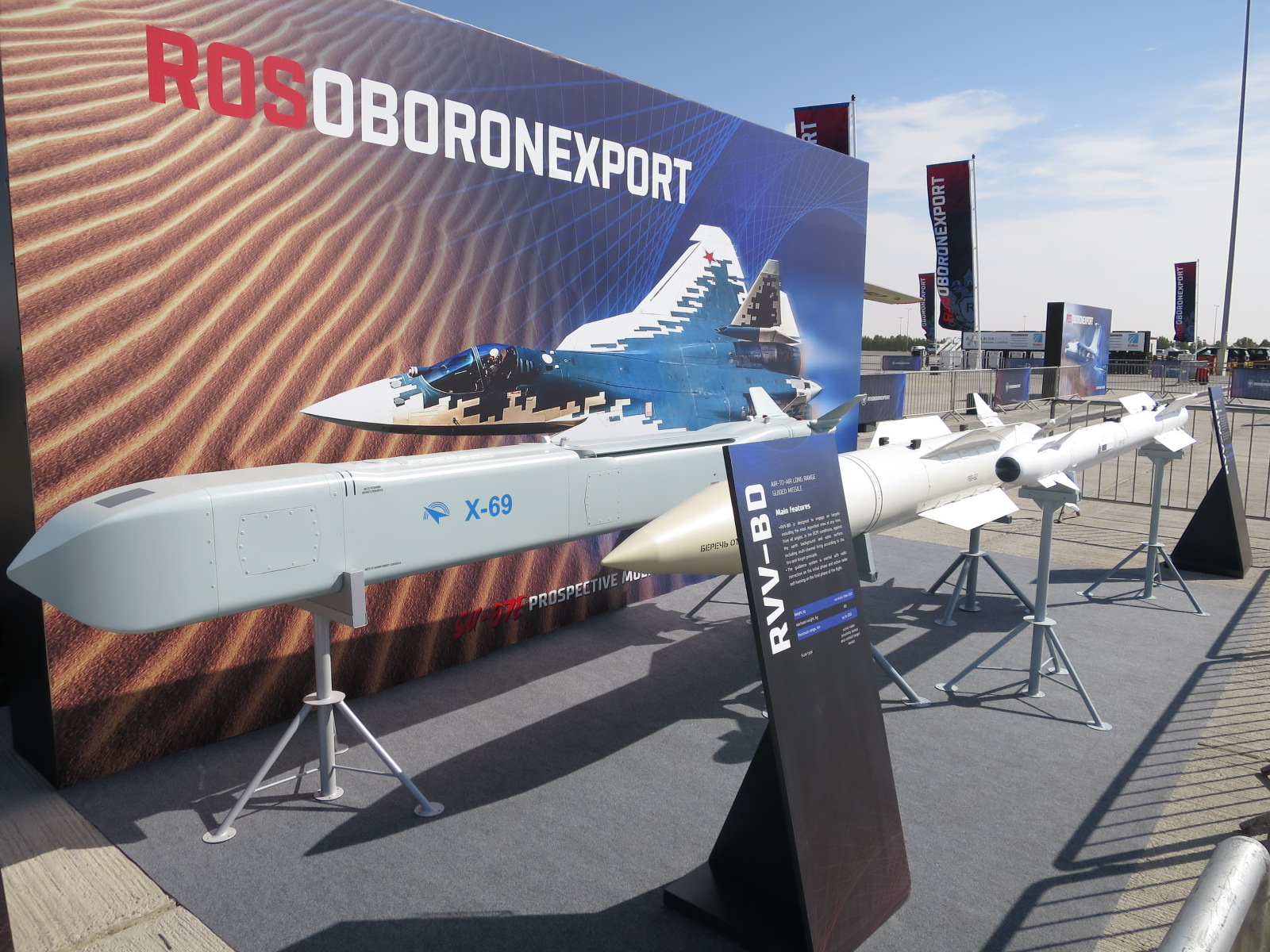

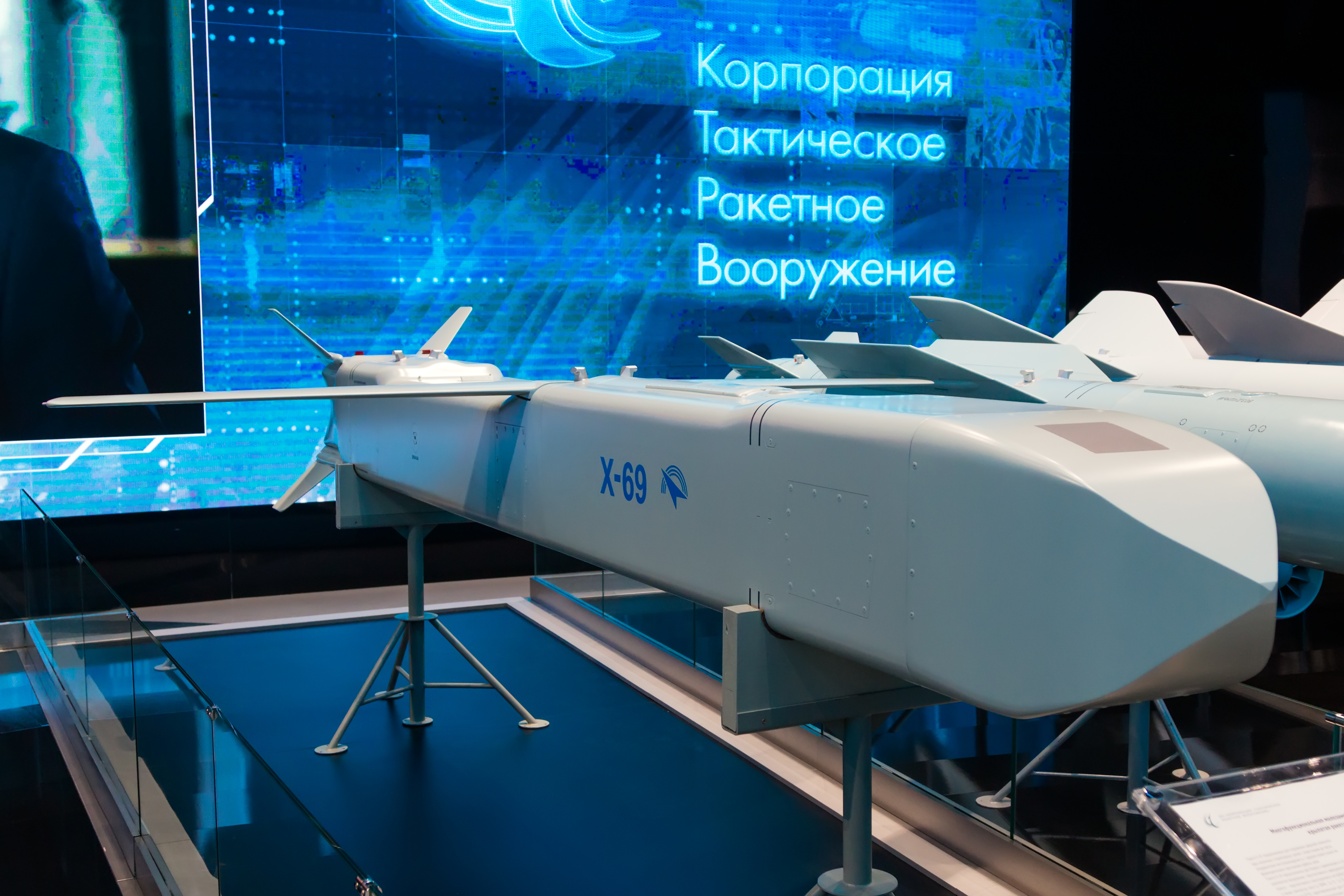

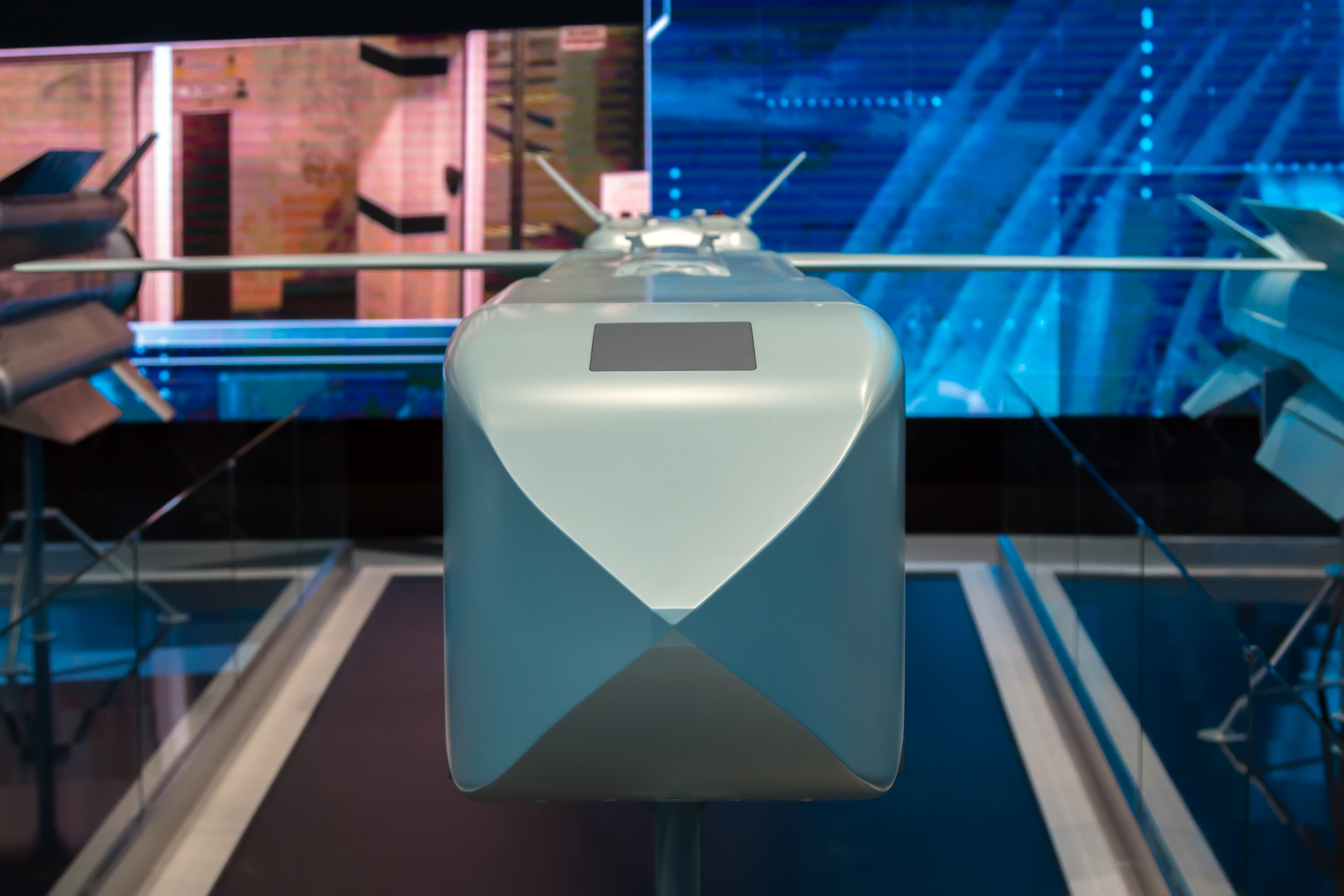
