= Kh-25 =

Kh-25ML/MLT/MR (NATO reporting name: AS-10 'Karen') Kh-25MP (AS-12 'Kegler')
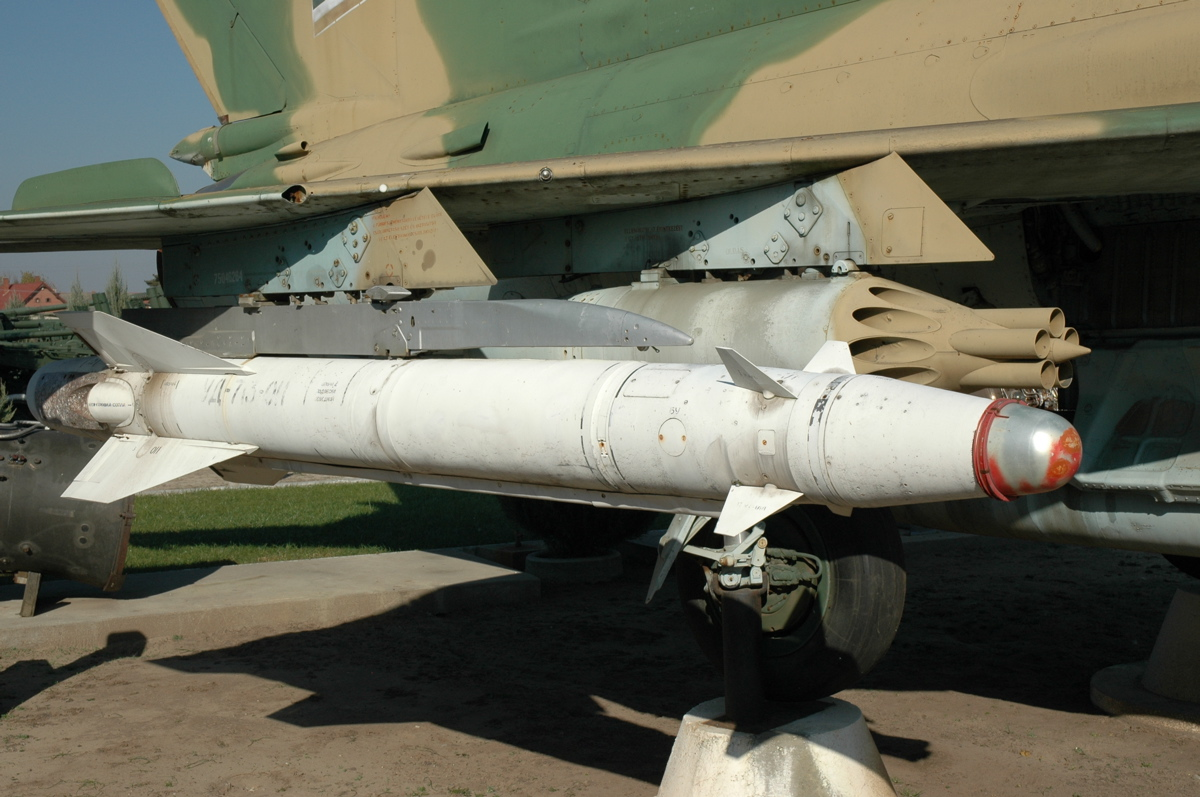
- Kh-25ML
- Type: tactical air-to-surface missile
- Place of origin: Soviet Union

Service history
- In service: 1975–present

Production history
- Designed: 1971–75
- Manufacturer: Zvezda-Strela
- Produced: 1975–present

Specifications
- Mass: Kh-25ML :299 kg (659 lb); Kh-25MP :315 kg (694 lb)
- Length: Kh-25ML :370.5 cm (12 ft 2 in); Kh-25MP 1VP :425.5 cm (167.5 in); Kh-25MP 2VP :435.5 cm (171.5 in)
- Diameter: 27.5 cm (10.8 in)
- Wingspan: 75.5 cm (29.7 in)
- Warhead: High explosive, shell-forming
- Warhead weight: Kh-25MP :89.6 kg (198 lb), Kh-25MR :140 kg (309 lb)
- Operational range: Kh-25ML :11 km (5.9 nmi); Kh-25MP :up to 60 km (32 nmi); Kh-25MTP : 20 km (11 nmi)
- Maximum speed: Kh-25ML :1,370–2,410 km/h (850–1,500 mph); Kh-25MP :1,080–1,620 km/h (670–1,000 mph)
- Guidance system: Laser guidance, passive radiation, TV guidance, IIR, Satellite guidance, active radar homing depending on variant
- Launch platform: MiG-21, MiG-23/27, MiG-29, Ka-52, Su-17/20/22, Su-24, Su-25, Su-27, Yakovlev Yak-130; Kh-25MP : MiG-23/27, Su-17/22, Su-24, Su-25 Ka-50

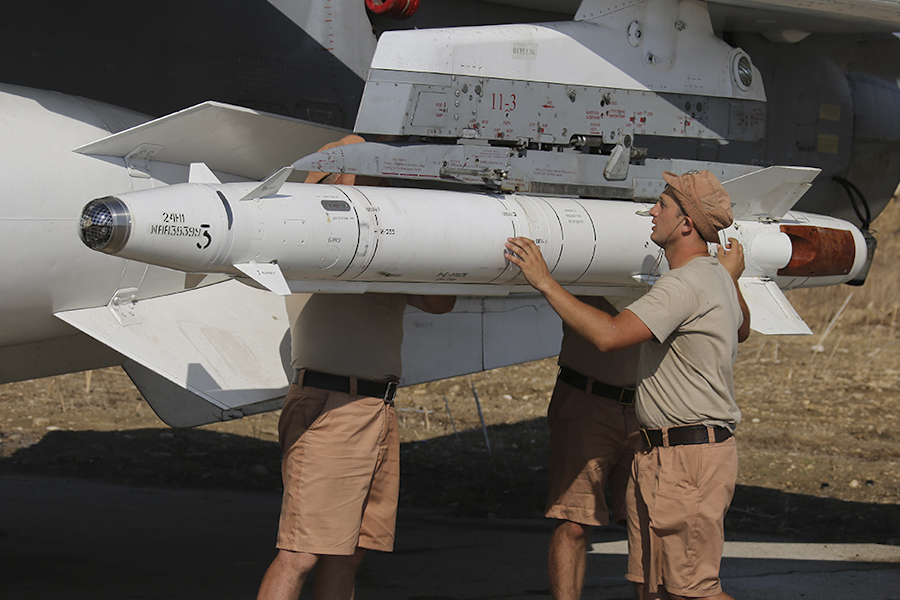
Kh-25 being mounted on a Russian Su-24 at Khmeimim air base for use against Syrian insurgent targets

The Kh-25/Kh-25M (Russian: Х-25; NATO: AS-10 'Karen') is a family of Soviet lightweight air-to-ground missiles with a modular range of guidance systems and a range of 10 km. The anti-radiation variant (Kh-25MP) is known to NATO as the AS-12 'Kegler' and has a range up to 40 km. Designed by Zvezda-Strela, the Kh-25 is derived from the laser-guided version of the Kh-23 Grom (AS-7 'Kerry'). The Kh-25 remains in widespread use despite the apparent development of a successor, the Kh-38.

== Development ==
Based on an air-to-air missile, the beam-riding Kh-66 had been the Soviet Union's first air-to-ground missile for tactical aircraft, entering service in 1968. However it proved difficult to use in practice as the launch aircraft had to dive towards the target. A version with radio-command guidance, the Kh-23, was first tested in 1968 but problems with the guidance system meant that it would not enter service for another five years. So in 1971 work began on a version with a semi-active laser seeker, which became the Kh-25. This was initially known in the West as the Kh-23L. State testing began on 24 November 1974, and the Kh-25 entered production in 1975.

Work began on an anti-radar missile derived from the Kh-66 in 1972, using a passive radar seeker and SUR-73 autopilot. The long-range Kh-31 anti-radar missile came out of the same project. The Kh-27 began state testing on a MiG-27 on 8 August 1975 but did not enter service until 2 September 1980. It was assigned the NATO reporting name AS-12 'Kegler' and in effect it replaced the much heavier Kh-28 (AS-9 'Kyle').

In 1973 Victor Bugaiskii was appointed head engineer of the bureau and he started work on combining the Kh-23M, Kh-25 and Kh-27 into a single modular system to reduce costs and improve tactical flexibility. The Kh-27 missile was chosen as a basis, due to its more powerful rocket engine and new autopilot. This was completed by the end of 1978, resulting in the Kh-25MP (anti-radar), Kh-25ML (laser-guided) and Kh-25MR (radio-guided) family. NATO continued to refer to these as the AS-12 and AS-10 respectively, even though they could now be switched by a simple change of seeker head.

== Design ==
The Kh-25 is very similar to the later version of the Kh-23 Grom, with cruciform canards and fins.

The Kh-25MP has two versions of its homing head, 1VP and 2VP, sensitive to different frequencies.

== Combat history ==
The original Kh-25 entered service with the Soviet Air Force between 1973-5, equipping the MiG-23, MiG-27 and Su-17M. Since then it has been cleared for use on the MiG-21, MiG-29, Sukhoi Su-17/20/22 family, Sukhoi Su-24, Su-25 and Su-27. It can also be carried by attack helicopters such as the Kamov Ka-50.

The Kh-25MP can be fitted to the MiG-23/27, Su-17/22, Su-24 and Su-25.

=== Soviet war in Afghanistan ===
Starting in April 1986, during the second Battle of Zhawar, Kh-25MLs were used by Soviet Su-25 Frogfoots from the 378th OShAP (Independent Shturmovik Aviation Regiment) to attack Mujahideen cave entrances used as shelters and weapons storage facilities. Attacks were carried out from up to 4.5 nm (8 km).

=== Iraqi invasion of Kuwait ===
During the Iraqi invasion of Kuwait, on August 2, 1990 an Iraqi Air Force Sukhoi Su-22 from the No.109 Squadron (based at as-Shoibiyah AB) fired a single Kh-25MP anti-radar variant against a Kuwaiti MIM-23B I-HAWK SAM site at Bubiyan Island that had earlier downed another Su-22 from the same unit and a MiG-23BN from the 49th Squadron. This forced a radar shutdown on the HAWK. The HAWK battery (which was operated by some American contractors) was later captured by Iraqi special forces and found to be in automatic mode of operation, after the contractors fled.

=== Chechen Wars ===
Russian Air Force Su-25s employed the Kh-25 in its two Chechen campaigns for attacks on fixed positions, such as mortars and bunkers. However, their usage wasn't extensive in relation to those of unguided bombs and rockets. The use of precision-guided munitions allowed air support in areas too dangerous for attack helicopters. Their use was not as widespread in the First War as it was in the Second, mainly due to differences in weather conditions and, probably, the need to keep a strategic reserve of stockpiles shortly after the fall of the USSR.

=== Russia intervention in Syria ===
Laser-guided Kh-25s were employed by Su-24 swing wing strike aircraft against anti-Assad rebels in Syria.

=== Russian invasion of Ukraine ===
Although rare, since August 2022, during its fight against Russian forces, the Ukrainian Air Force has been observed using radio-command-guided Kh-25MR and semi-active laser-guided Kh-25ML missiles. They have been spotted launched from Su-24M tactical bombers during pitch-up mode, apparently done to increase the missiles' range, as they are short-range weapons for tactical aviation.

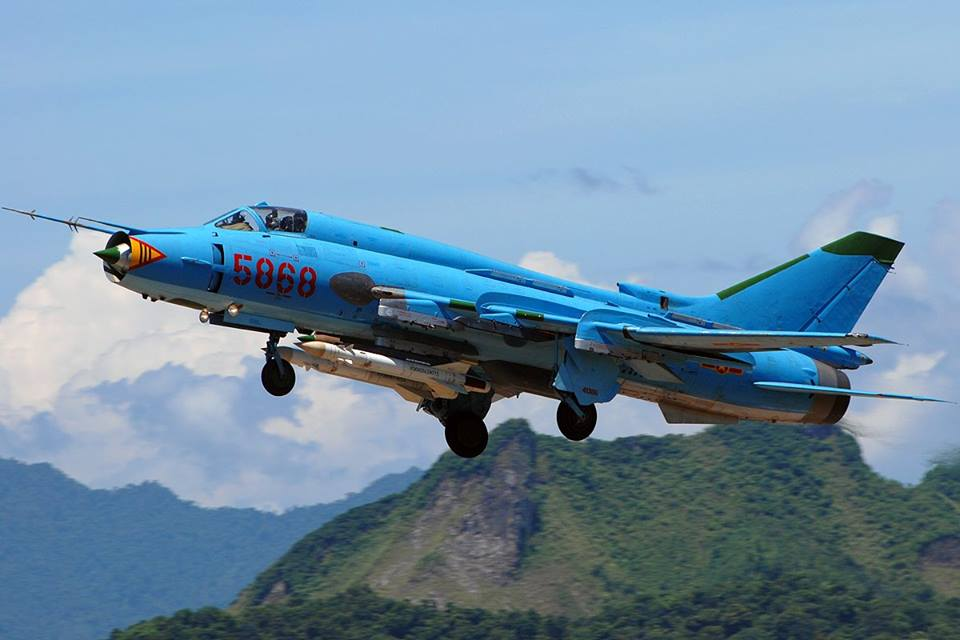
Vietnam People's Air Force Sukhoi Su-22M4 with a pair of Kh-25MP ARM.

== Variants ==
NATO refers to all of the Kh-25 family as AS-10 'Karen' apart from the anti-radar variants. An "M" designation stands for "Modulnaya" – modular (seeker head).

- Kh-25 (Izdeliye 71, Kh-23L) – original laser-guided variant
- Kh-25ML – semi-active laser guidance with tandem warhead that can penetrate 1 metre (39 in) of concrete
- Kh-25MA – active radar guidance, first offered for export in 1999
- Kh-25MAE – Kh-25MA update announced for export in August 2005 with Ka-band seeker, probably Phazotron's PSM which can detect a tank at 4,000 m (4,370 yd) and which can also be used on the Kh-25MA
- Kh-25MS – satellite navigation (GPS or GLONASS)
- Kh-25MSE – export version of Kh-25MS, announced August 2005
- Kh-25MT – TV guidance
- Kh-25MTP – infra-red guidance variant of Kh-25MT
- Kh-25R/Kh-25MR – Radio-command guidance variant, it has a bigger 140 kg (309 lb) warhead.
- Kh-27 (Kh-27/M, AS-12 'Kegler') – original anti-radiation missile
- Kh-25MP (AS-12 'Kegler') – modular anti-radiation variant
- Kh-25MPU (AS-12 'Kegler') – Updated Kh-25MP

Training rounds have "U" designations, so, e.g., for the Kh-25ML there is:

- Kh-25MUL – combat training Kh-25ML
- Kh-25ML-UD – functional training missile
- Kh-25ML-UR – sectional training missile

== Operators ==
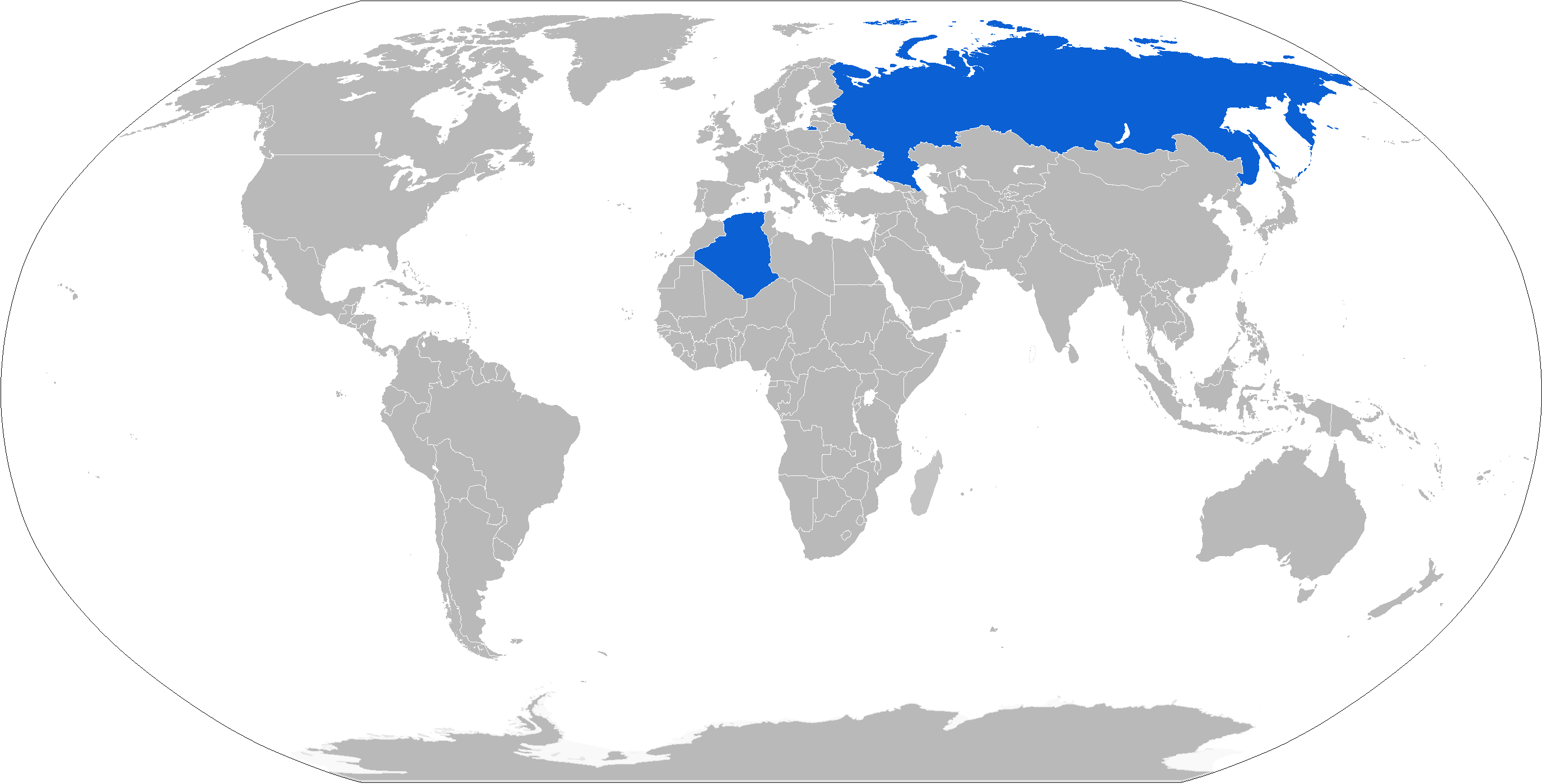
Map with Kh-25 operators in blue

=== Current ===
- Algeria
- Belarus
- Bulgaria
- China
- Ethiopia − Ethiopian Air Force, Kh-25ML on the Su-25
- Iran − Kh-25 and Kh-25ML variants used
- North Korea
- Kazakhstan
- Poland
- Syria
- Ukraine − Used on Su-24M bombers
- Uzbekistan

=== Former ===
- Afghanistan − Kh-25ML and Kh-25MP delivered between 1988 and 1989
- Czechoslovakia − Kh-25MR, Kh-25ML, and Kh-25MP variants
- East Germany − Kh-25MP
- Hungary − Kh-25ML and Kh-25MP variants
- India − Kh-25MLT used on MiG-23BN and MiG-27
- Iraq
- Libya
- Romania − Kh-25MP
- Russia − Replaced by the Kh-38M
- Soviet Union − Passed on to successor states
- Vietnam − Vietnam People's Air Force used Kh-25 variants with the Sukhoi Su-22 and the Su-30MK2 as late as 2014

== Similar weapons ==
- Kh-23M (AS-7 'Kerry') – predecessor to the Kh-25 had some technology "backported" from the Kh-25
- Kh-29 (AS-14 'Kedge') – 320 kg warhead; semi-active laser, IIR, passive radar and TV guidance with 10–30 km range
- Kh-59 (AS-13 'Kingbolt') – longer range missile with heavier warhead and TV guidance
- Kh-38 – successor to the Kh-25
- AGM-65 Maverick – similar lightweight missile in US service which has seen numerous guidance and warhead variants
- AGM-45 Shrike – US equivalent to the Kh-25MP anti-radar missile

== Bibliography ==
- International Institute for Strategic Studies (2024). The Military Balance 2024. Taylor & Francis. ISBN 978-1-040-05115-3.
