= Kh-29 =

Kh-29 (NATO reporting name: AS-14 'Kedge')
- Side-view of a Kh-29T
- Type: Air-to-surface missile
- Place of origin: Soviet Union

Service history
- In service: 1980s–present
- Used by: Warsaw Pact, China, India, Iraq
- Wars: Iran–Iraq War; Second Libyan Civil War; Syrian Civil War; Russian intervention in the Syrian civil war; Russo-Ukrainian War; Russo-Ukrainian war

Production history
- Designer: Matus Bisnovat; Georgiy I. Khokhlov
- Designed: 1975
- Manufacturer: Vympel / Tactical Missiles Corporation
- Produced: 1980–present

Specifications
- Mass: Kh-29L: 660 kg (1,460 lb); Kh-29T: 685 kg (1,510 lb); Kh-29TE: 690 kg (1,520 lb)
- Length: Kh-29L/T: 390 cm (12 ft 10 in); Kh-29TE: 387.5 cm (12 ft 9 in)
- Diameter: 38.0 cm (15.0 in)
- Wingspan: 110 cm (43 in)
- Warhead: HE armour-piercing
- Warhead weight: 320 kg (705 lb)
- Detonation mechanism: Impact
- Engine: Fixed thrust solid fuel rocket
- Operational range: Kh-29L: 10 km (5.4 nmi); Kh-29T: 12 km (6.5 nmi); Kh-29TE: 30 km (16 nmi)
- Maximum speed: 2,200 km/h (1,400 mph); Kh-29ML: 900–1,260 km/h (560–780 mph)
- Guidance system: Kh-29L: semi-active laser guidance Kh-29T/TE: passive homing TV guidance Kh-29D: infrared homing guidance (IIR); Kh-29MP: active radar homing
- Launch platform: Kh-29L&T: MiG-27K, MiG-29, Su-22, Su-27UB, Su-30MK, Su-39 Kh-29L only: Su-25; Kh-29T only: Su-35 Also: Mirage F1E, Su-17/22, Su-24, Su-33, Su-34, Su-37

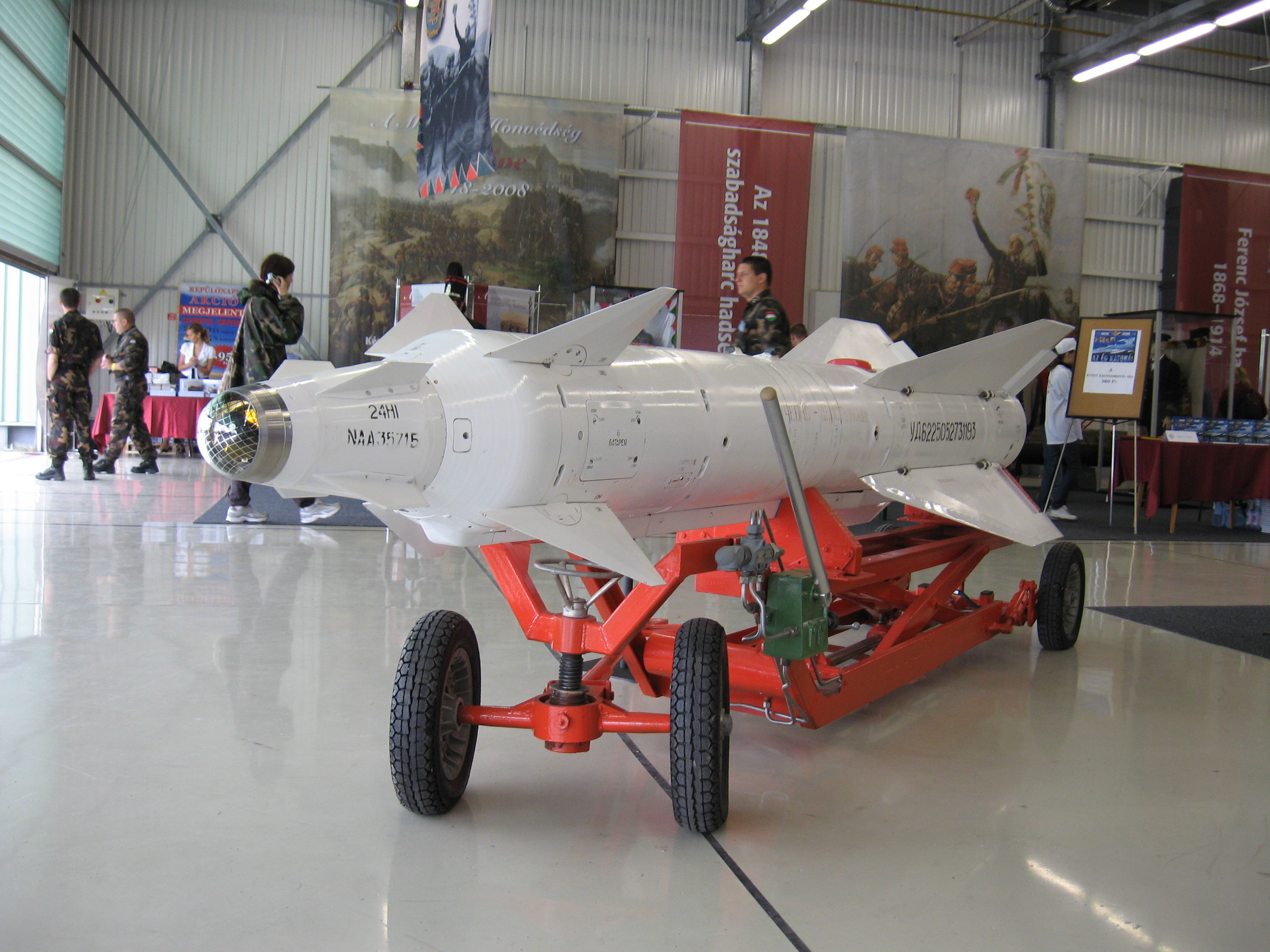
Kh-29L

The Kh-29 (Russian: Х-29; NATO: AS-14 'Kedge'; GRAU: 9M721) is a Soviet air-to-surface missile with a range of 10–30 km. It has a large warhead of 320 kg, has a choice of laser, infrared, active radar or TV guidance, and is typically carried by tactical aircraft such as the Su-24, Su-30, MiG-29K as well as the Su-25, giving these aircraft an expanded standoff capability.

The Kh-29 is intended for primary use against larger battlefield targets and infrastructure such as industrial buildings, depots and bridges, but can also be used against ships up to 10,000 tonnes, hardened aircraft shelters and concrete runways.

== Development ==
Design started in the late 1970s at the Molniya design bureau in Ukrainian SSR on what would be their only air-to-ground munition, but when they moved exclusively to space work Vympel NPO took over development of the Kh-29. The first firing of the missile took place in 1976 and after extensive trials the Kh-29 was accepted into service in 1980.

== Design ==
The basic aerodynamic layout of the Kh-29 is similar to the Molniya R-60 (AA-8 'Aphid'), reflecting Molniya's heritage in air-to-air missiles. The laser guidance head came from the Kh-25 (AS-10 'Karen') and the TV guidance from the Kh-59 (AS-13 'Kingbolt'), mated to a large warhead.

It has been compared to the United States' AGM-65 Maverick, but the AGM-65 is a much smaller missile than the Kh-29, and weighs less than half as much.

Compared to the AGM-65 Maverick, the Kh-29 has a 20% higher top speed (1,150 km/h vs 1,470 km/h) and a much bigger warhead (320 kg vs 136 kg).

== Operational history ==
The Kh-29 entered service with the Soviet Air Force in 1980, and has been widely exported since.

The Kh-29L was used by Sukhoi Su-34 and Su-24 aircraft in the 2015 Russian military intervention in the Syrian Civil War.

=== 2014 Libyan conflict ===
Kh-29 missiles were supplied to Libya in the 1980s for use on the Libyan Air Force's Su-24s. These aircraft have all been destroyed during the 2011 NATO-led intervention, and no other aircraft in the Libyan arsenal could use these missiles. Hence, they have been transformed into unguided surface-to-surface rockets, launched from modified trucks and with their fins and ailerons at the front and back removed for a somewhat more stable flight path. They were used by National Salvation Government forces around Tripoli in 2014, during the Second Libyan Civil War (they were seized from Ghardabiya Air Base depots).

=== 2022 Russian invasion of Ukraine ===
The Kh-29 missile has possibly seen limited use in the 2022 Russian invasion of Ukraine, being fired from Su-34 aircraft.

== Variants ==
- Kh-29L (Izdeliye 63, 'Kedge-A') uses a semi-active laser seeker and has a range of 8–10 km.
- Kh-29ML is an upgraded version of the Kh-29L.
- Kh-29T (Izdeliye 64, 'Kedge-B') is the TV-guided version, which is fitted with automatic optical homing to a distinguishable object indicated by the pilot.
- Kh-29TE is a long-range (30 km) development of the Kh-29T. The minimum range is 3 km; launch altitude is 200–10,000 m.
- Kh-29MP is a variant that uses active radar homing, making it a fire-and-forget weapon. It has a 250 kg warhead and a 12 km range.
- Kh-29D is the fourth variant of the Kh-29TE which uses imaging infrared guidance.

== Operators ==
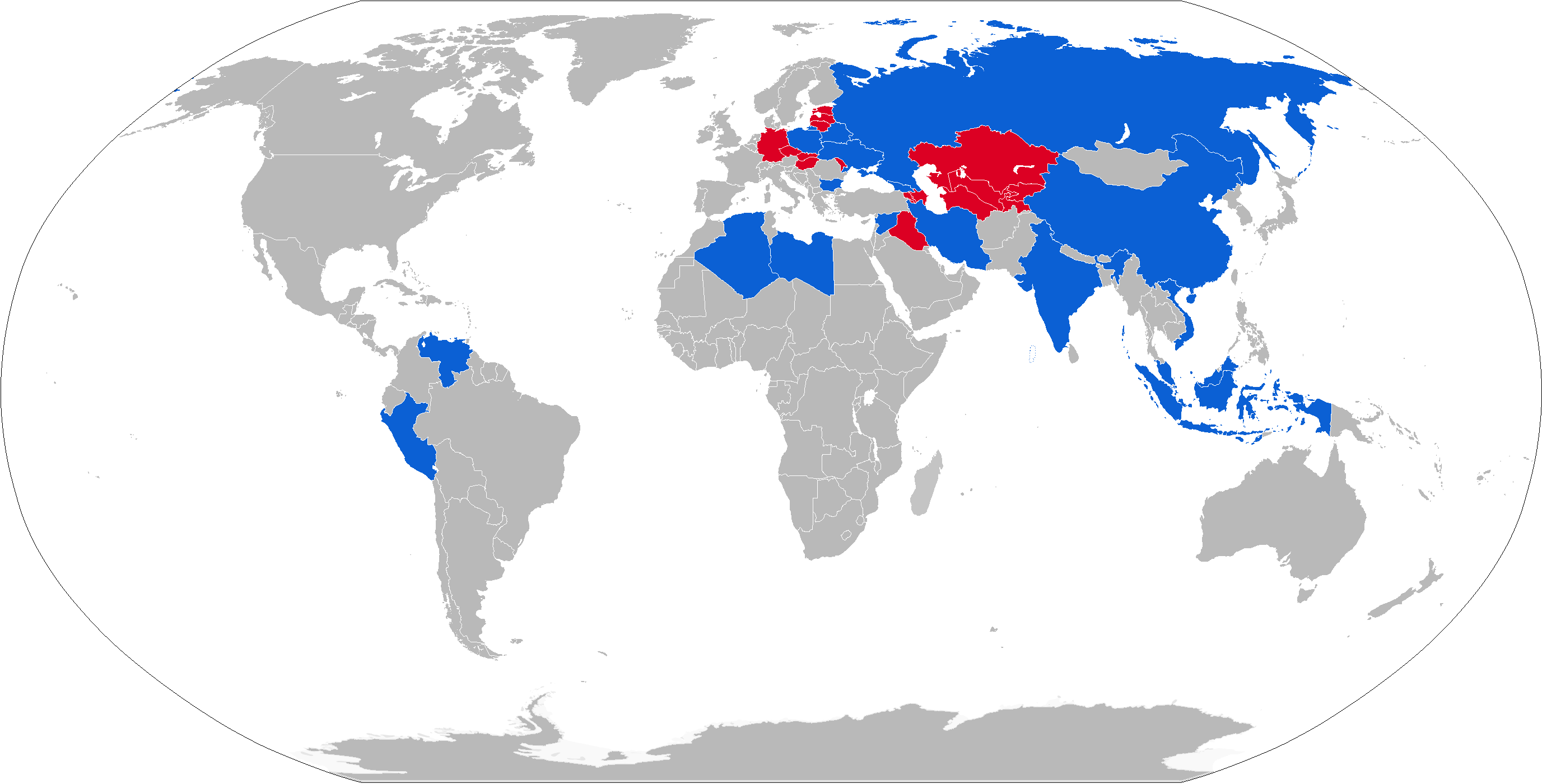
Map with Kh-29 operators in blue with former operators in red

=== Current operators ===
- Algeria: Algerian Air Force
- Belarus: Belarusian Air Force on its modernized MiG-29BMs.
- Bulgaria: Bulgarian Air Force on its Su-22M4s, which were withdrawn from service in 2004. Also used on Su-25s.
- China: People's Liberation Army Air Force – received 2,000 Kh-29Ts in 2002 for use on their Su-27SKs, Su-27UBKs, Su-30MKKs, Shenyang J-11s and possibly their JH-7s and Q-5s.
- Ethiopia: Ethiopian Air Force, Kh-29T on its Su-25TKs
- Georgia: Georgian Air Force on its Su-25KM Scorpions
- India: Indian Air Force on its Su-30MKIs and Indian Navy on its MiG-29Ks.
- Indonesia: the Indonesian Air Force uses the Kh-29TE on its Su-30MK2s
- Iran: Islamic Republic of Iran Air Force on its Su-24s
- Kazakhstan
- North Korea
- Libya: National Salvation Government
- Malaysia: Royal Malaysian Air Force used on its Su-30MKMs
- Peru: Peruvian Air Force
- Russia: Russian Aerospace Forces
- Serbia: Serbian Air Force, Kh-29TE on the MiG-29SM
- Syria: Syrian Air Force
- Ukraine: Ukrainian Air Force
- Venezuela
- Vietnam
- Yemen: Yemeni Air Force on its MiG-29s

=== Former operators ===
- Czechoslovakia: Czechoslovak Air Force – passed onto successor states
- East Germany: East German Air Force
- Germany: Phased out after German reunification
- Hungary: Hungarian Air Force on Su-22M3s
- Iraq: Iraqi Air Force
- Libyan Arab Jamahiriya: Libyan Air Force – Left without launch platforms after all Su-24s were destroyed in the civil war and subsequent NATO bombings. Subsequently used in a surface-to-surface role.
- Poland: Polish Air Force – Formerly used on its Su-22M4s.
- Slovakia: Slovak Air Force – Su-22M4s
- Soviet Union: Soviet Air Force – passed on to successor states

== See also ==
- Kh-25 (AS-10/12 'Karen/Kegler') – 320 kg missile with 90 kg warhead and 10–25 km range
- AGM-65 Maverick – 200–300 kg missile with 57–135 kg warhead and 27 km range
- AGM-62 Walleye I – 1967 US glide bomb delivering 385 kg warhead over 30 km.
