= Babij =

Babij, Babiy or Babii (Ukrainian: Бабій) is a Ukrainian surname. Notable people with the surname include:

- Ivan Babii (1893–1934), Ukrainian educator and activist
- Oleh Babiy (1990–2023), Ukrainian military officer
- Oleksandr Babiy (born 1968), retired Ukrainian football player
- Olga Babiy (Kalinina; born 1989), Ukrainian chess player
- Sorin Babii (born 1963), retired Romanian pistol shooter
