= Kh-32 =

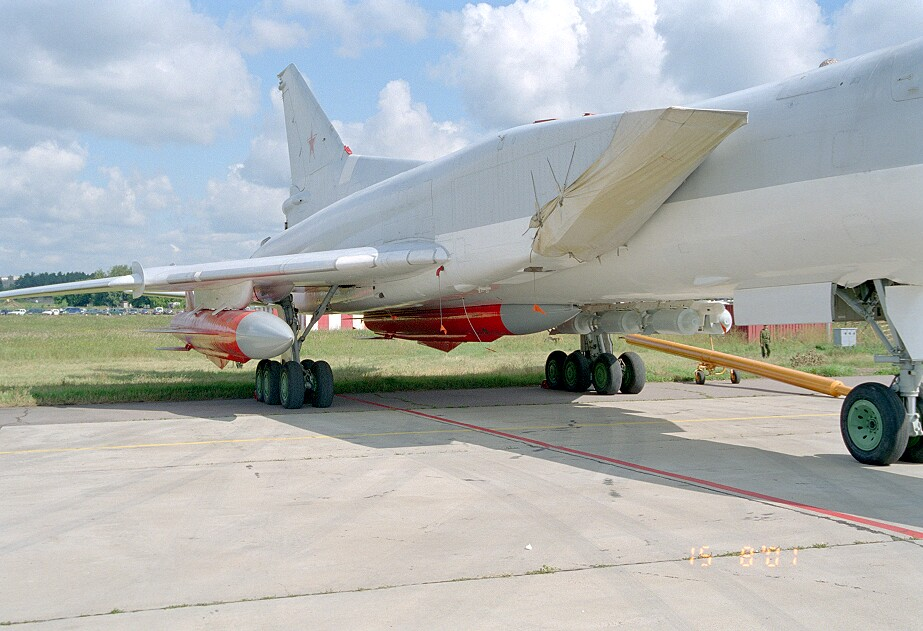
- Tu-22M3 with a Kh-22 missile. Kh-32 shares its hull with its predecessor.
- Type: Air-to-surface missile
- Place of origin: Soviet Union

Service history
- Used by: Russia

Production history
- Designer: MKB Raduga
- Produced: 1990s

Specifications
- Warhead: 500 kg (1,100 lb) RDX
- Engine: rocket
- Operational range: 600–1,000 km (320–540 nmi)
- Flight ceiling: 40,000 m
- Maximum speed: Mach 3.5 – Mach 4.6 (4,290–5,640 km/h; 2,660–3,500 mph)
- Guidance system: Inertial guidance followed by terminal active radar homing
- Launch platform: Tu-22M3M

Kh-32 (Russian: Х-32) is a Russian supersonic air-launched cruise missile with a range of 600–1000 km developed by the MKB Raduga from the Kh-22. The missile was accepted to service in 2016 as armament for the Tu-22M3M bombers.

== History ==
Work on the modernization of the Kh-22 missile began in the Soviet Union during the late 1980s, due to vulnerability to ECM of its guidance radar operating at fixed frequencies. When an enemy is using radar jamming, the Kh-22 has very low probability of success.

A state contract (No. 01133) for development work on an update was signed on 19 June 1990. Due to the general crisis in the country and insufficient financing, work was suspended several times. In 1998, the first missile tests were carried out but further work was stopped due to lack of funding. Development resumed on 7 March 2008, when contract No. 83042, for testing prototype missiles was signed with the Raduga State Committee for Design and Development. OJSC Tupolev was to re-equip one Tu-22M3 bomber for testing. In 2010, the Council of Ministers of Russia ordered the pilot production as part of the modernization of the Tu-22M3 fleet. Flight tests of the aircraft with missiles were conducted at the end of July 2013. Several flights were completed, including at least one flight with missile launches.

In 2016 the Kh-32 missile was officially accepted into service. Russia has planned modernization of 30 Tu-22M3 aircraft into the Tu-22M3M version. On 19 April 2024, Ukraine claimed to have shot down two Kh-22/32s for the first time during the war. Pictures were later released showing the Kh-32 was manufactured in 2023 and that it had suffered damage from an anti-aircraft missile.

== Design ==
=== Differences from Kh-22 ===
The Kh-32 missile uses the same body as the Kh-22 with externally identical dimensions. Warhead weight has been reduced to 500 kg (1,100 lb) to improve range. Kh-32 has a new, more powerful engine.

== Sources and literature ==
- Karpenko, A.V.; BTS "Bastion".
- Aviation and Astronautics, № 5, 1996.
