= Shaykovka air base =

Airbase in Kaluga Oblast, Russia

Shaykovka
- авиабаза Шайковка
- Kirov, Kaluga Oblast in Russia
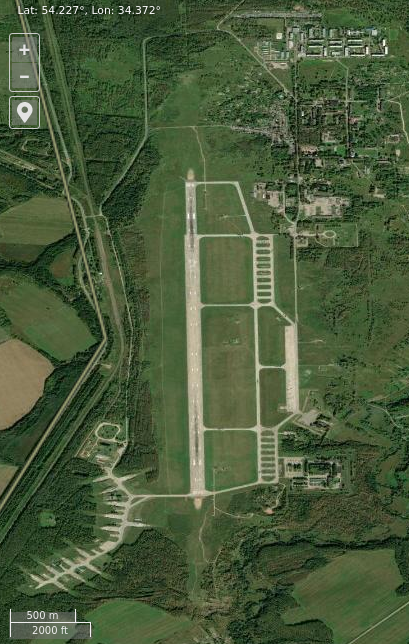
- Satellite imagery of Shaykovka air base

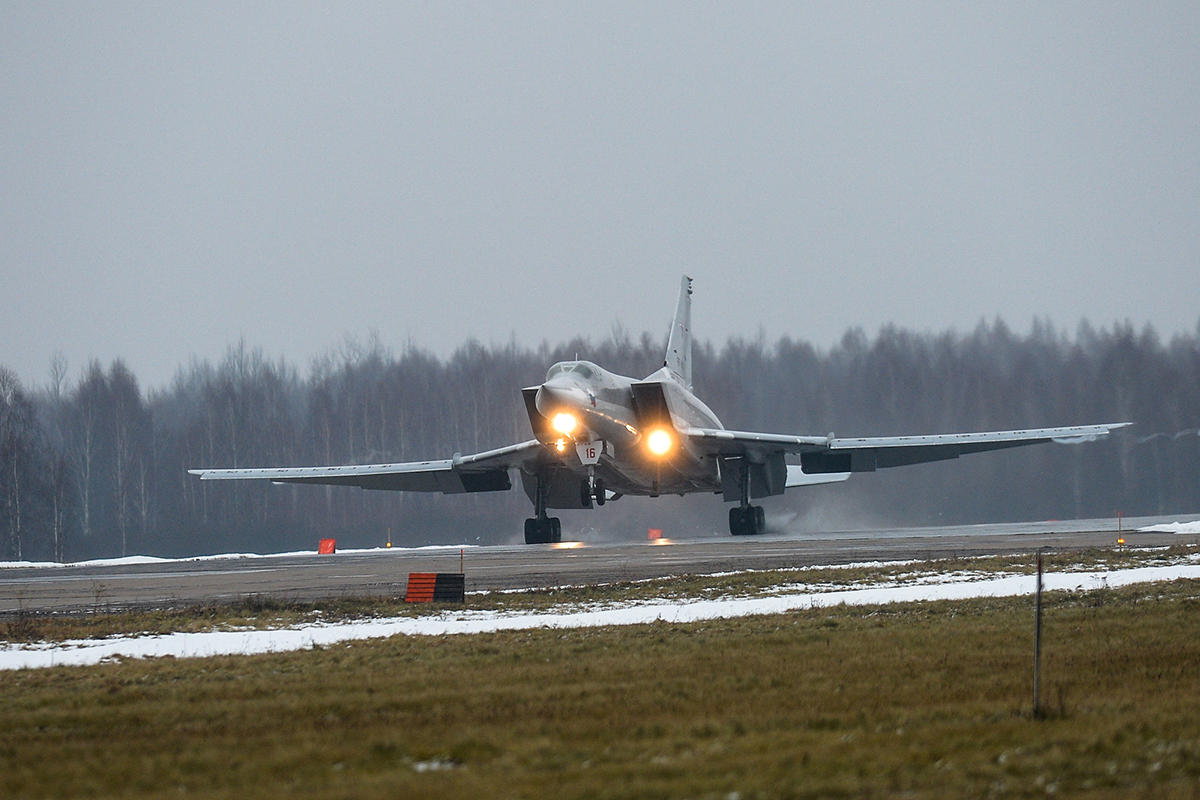
- Tu-22M landing at Shaykovka in 2017

Site information
- Type: Air Base
- Owner: Ministry of Defence
- Operator: Russian Aerospace Forces
- Controlled by: Long-Range Aviation

Location
- Shown within Kaluga Oblast Shaykovka (Russia)
- Coordinates: 54°13′36″N 34°22′18″E

Site history
- Built: 1937
- In use: 1937 - present

Airfield information
- Identifiers: ICAO: XUBJ
- Elevation: 203 metres (666 ft) AMSL
Runways
Direction	Length and surface
16/34	3,000 metres (9,843 ft) Concrete

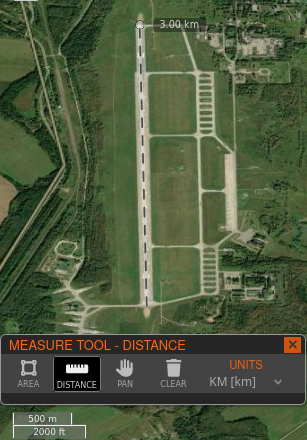
NASA FIRMS's measure tool shows a runway extension to 3.00 km

Shaykovka air base (Russian: Шайковка; State airfields index: ЬУБЙ), also given variously as Kirov Shaykovka, Anisovo Gorod, Anisovo Gorodishche, Shaykovo, Shajkovka, Gorodische, Chaikovka, is an airbase of the Russian Aerospace Forces in Kaluga Oblast, Russia located 17 km north of Kirov, Kaluga Oblast. It is a large airfield with hangars and an extensive alert area for fighters. NASA's FIRMS indicates the runway overrun has been hardened to extend the runway to 3000 m. In 2000, Tupolev Tu-160, Tupolev Tu-95MS, and Tupolev Tu-22M3 aircraft operated out of this base during a training exercise. The Natural Resources Defense Council listed the base as a nuclear site in a study.

As of 2020, the 52nd Heavy Bomber Regiment of the 22nd Guards Heavy Bomber Division was still reported resident at the base flying Tu-22M3 Backfires. In 2021 Tu-22M3 Backfires from the base forward deployed to Russian bases in Syria for operations and exercises in the region.

== History ==
The airfield was built by 1937, when the 13th Separate High-Speed Bomber Aviation Squadron of the Air Forces of the Belorussian Military District with Tupolev SB bombers was stationed there.

Units stationed here have included the 73rd gv. iap (73-й гв. иап: гвардейский истребительный авиационный полк - 73rd Guards Interceptor Aviation Regiment) flying Mikoyan MiG-29 aircraft in the 1990s and 2000s; and the 52nd gv. tbap (152-й гв. тбап: гвардейский тяжелый бомбардировочный авиаполк - 52nd Guards Heavy Bomber Aviation Regiment) flying Tupolev Tu-16 bombers, taking on 19 Tupolev Tu-22M aircraft starting in 1982, and transitioning to an ITBAP (Instructor Heavy Bomber Aviation Regiment) in 1989.

=== Syrian Civil War ===
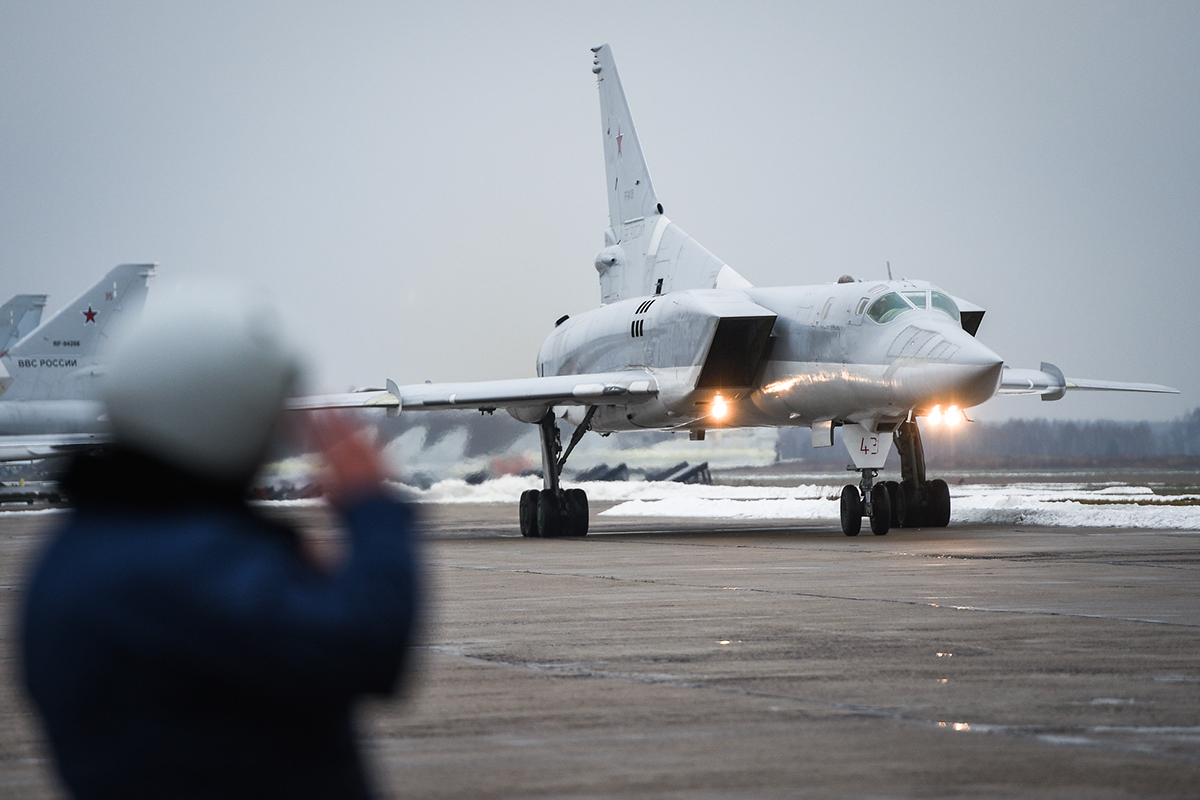
Tu-22M3 taxiing at Shaykovka air base in 2017 after bombing missions in Syria

On December 12, 2017, a ceremony was held at Shaykovka air base when a fleet of Tu-22M3 returned from the Russian intervention in the Syrian civil war. Lieutenant general and long-range-aviation commander Sergey Kobylash awarded the returning crews with the medal "Participant of the military operation in Syria". Attendants in the ceremony included crew relatives, veterans and representatives of Yunarmiya.

=== Russian invasion of Ukraine ===
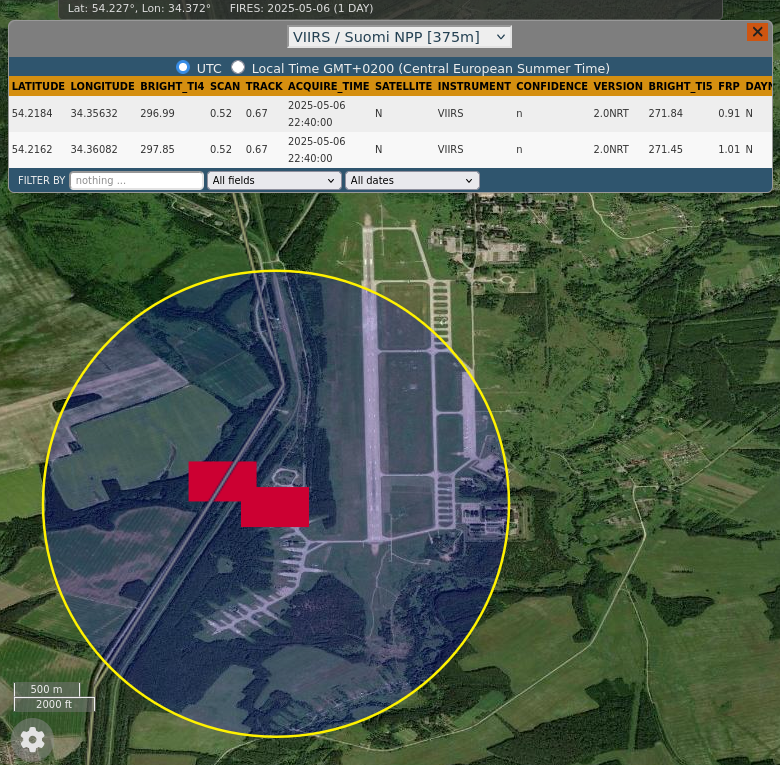
NASA's FIRMS detected fires at Shaykovka air base on 6 May 2025 22:40:00 (UTC)

On 27 June 2022 Tu-22M3 bombers out of Shaykovka air base fired two Kh-22 anti-ship missiles into central Kremenchuk, Poltava Oblast, Ukraine in what became known as the Kremenchuk shopping mall attack that killed at least 20 people and injured at least 56.

On 7 October 2022 there were reports of a kamikaze drone attack on the air base, destroying two Tu-22M3 bombers.

On 20 October 2024, the Shaykovka air base chief of staff and bomber pilot responsible for recent attacks on civilian infrastructure in Ukraine, was found dead in an apple orchard in Bryansk Oblast, apparently a targeted assassination. Dmitry Vladimirovich Golenkov was reportedly responsible for the missile attacks on the Kremenchuk Shopping Mall (22 deaths, with >1000 in the buildings at the time) Kremenchuk, Poltava Oblast, in June 2022, and the Dnipro apartment building which killed 46 people in January 2023 in Dnipro. Golenkov had earlier spoken with a journalist about the attacks.

On 7 May 2025 a Ukrainian drone attack caused fires at the air base.

== See also ==
- List of military airbases in Russia
