= Tupolev Tu-22M =

Russian long-range supersonic strategic bomber

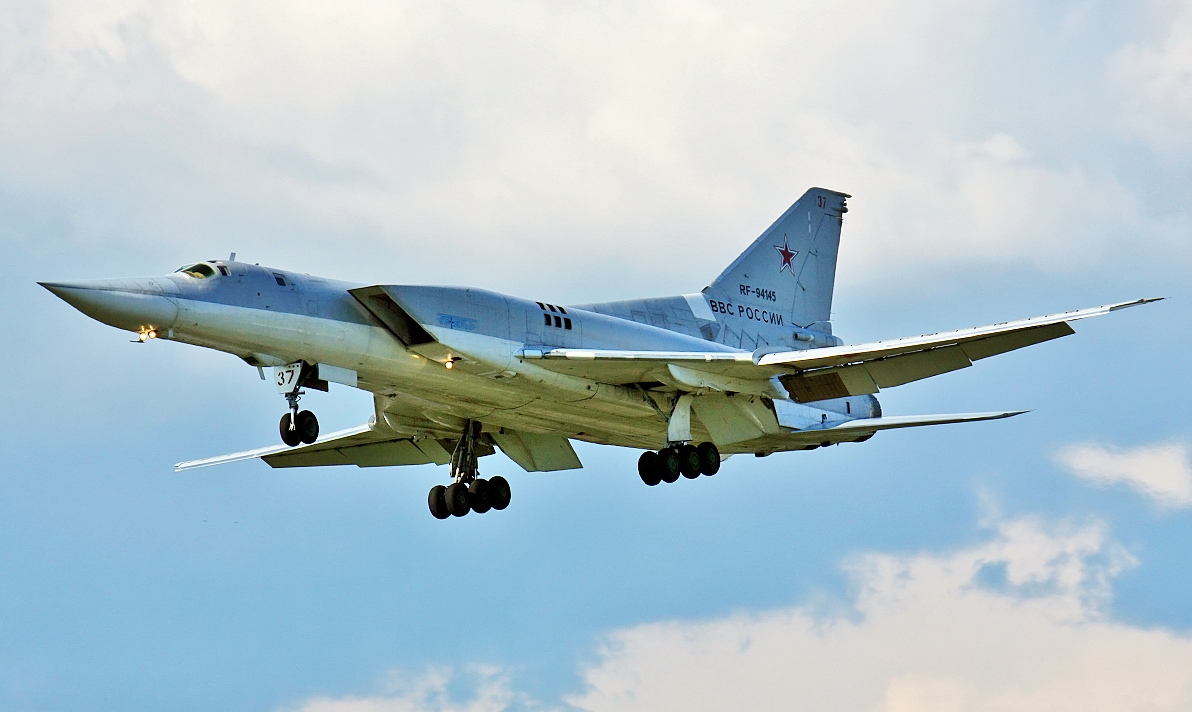
- A Russian Aerospace Forces Tu-22M3

General information
- Type: Strategic bomber/Maritime strike
- National origin: Soviet Union
- Manufacturer: Tupolev
- Status: In service
- Primary users: Russian Aerospace Forces: Soviet Air Forces (historical); Ukrainian Air Force (historical)
- Number built: 497

History
- Manufactured: 1967–1993
- Introduction date: 1972
- First flight: 30 August 1969; 57 years ago
- Developed from: Tupolev Tu-22

The Tupolev Tu-22M (Russian: Туполев Ту-22М; NATO reporting name: Backfire) is a Soviet nuclear capable, supersonic, variable-sweep wing, long-range strategic and maritime strike bomber developed by the Tupolev Design Bureau in the 1960s. The bomber was reported as being designated Tu-26 by Western intelligence at one time. During the Cold War, the Tu-22M was operated by the Soviet Air Forces (VVS) in a missile carrier strategic bombing role, and by the Soviet Naval Aviation (Aviatsiya Voyenno-Morskogo Flota, AVMF) in a long-range maritime anti-shipping role.

The Tu-22M was first used for conventional bombing by the Soviet Union in the Soviet–Afghan War. Russia has flown the Tu-22M on bombing missions in the First Chechen War, Russo-Georgian War, intervention in the Syrian civil war, and Russo-Ukrainian war. On 1 June 2025, Ukraine's Operation Spiderweb drone attack destroyed four Tu-22Ms at Belaya air base.

The aircraft has been forward-deployed to the Turkmen SSR, Syria, and Iran. Soviet and Russian Tu-22Ms have typically patrolled, carried out simulated attacks in, and been intercepted over the Baltic Sea, and occasionally the North Pacific.

Under the Nunn–Lugar Cooperative Threat Reduction program, the 60 Tu-22Ms inherited by the Ukrainian Air Force were dismantled by 2006. In 2024, the Russian Air Force had 57 aircraft in service, according to the 2024 Military Balance report by International Institute for Strategic Studies. However, Ukraine's Main Directorate of Intelligence estimated that Russia had only 27 aircraft in operable condition in 2023.

== Development ==
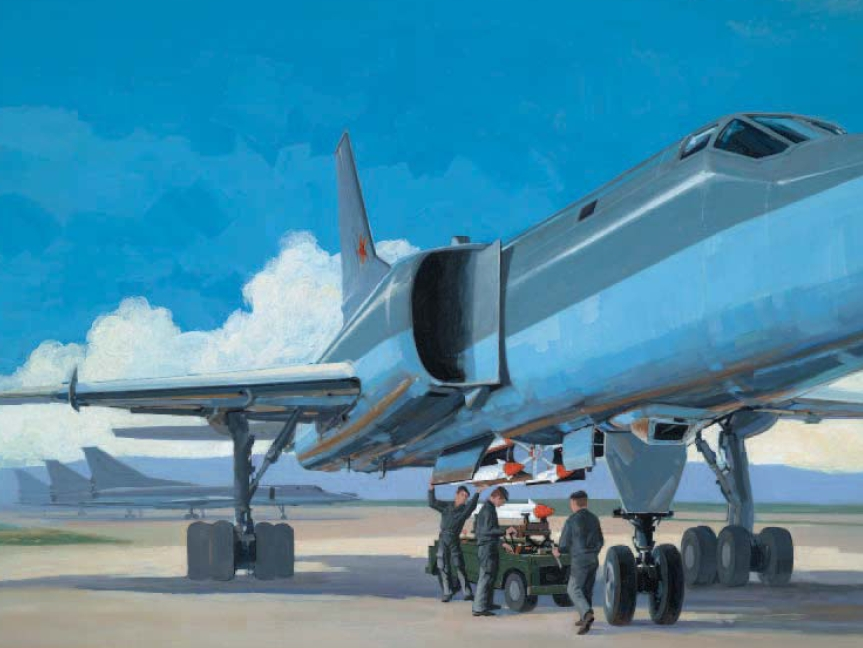
A painting depicting the loading of Raduga Kh-15 missiles on a Tu-22M rotary launcher. The bomber depicted is an early Tu-22M2, with distinctive air intakes.

In 1962, after the introduction of the Tupolev Tu-22, it became increasingly clear that the aircraft was inadequate in its role as a bomber. In addition to widespread unserviceability and maintenance problems, the Tu-22's handling characteristics proved to be dangerous. Its landing speed was 100 km/h (60 mph) greater than previous bombers and it had a tendency to pitch up and strike its tail upon landing. It was difficult to fly, and had poor all-round visibility. In 1962, Tupolev commenced work on a major update of the Tu-22. Initially, the bureau planned to add a variable-sweep wing and uprated engines into the updated design. The design was tested at TsAGI's wind tunnels at Zhukovsky.

During this time Sukhoi developed the T-4, a four-engine titanium aircraft with canards. A response to the XB-70, it was to have a cruise speed of 3,200 km/h (2,000 mph), requiring a major research effort in order to develop the requisite technologies. Tupolev, whose expertise was with bombers, offered the Soviet Air Force (Voyenno-Vozdushnye Sily, VVS) a massively updated version of the Tu-22.

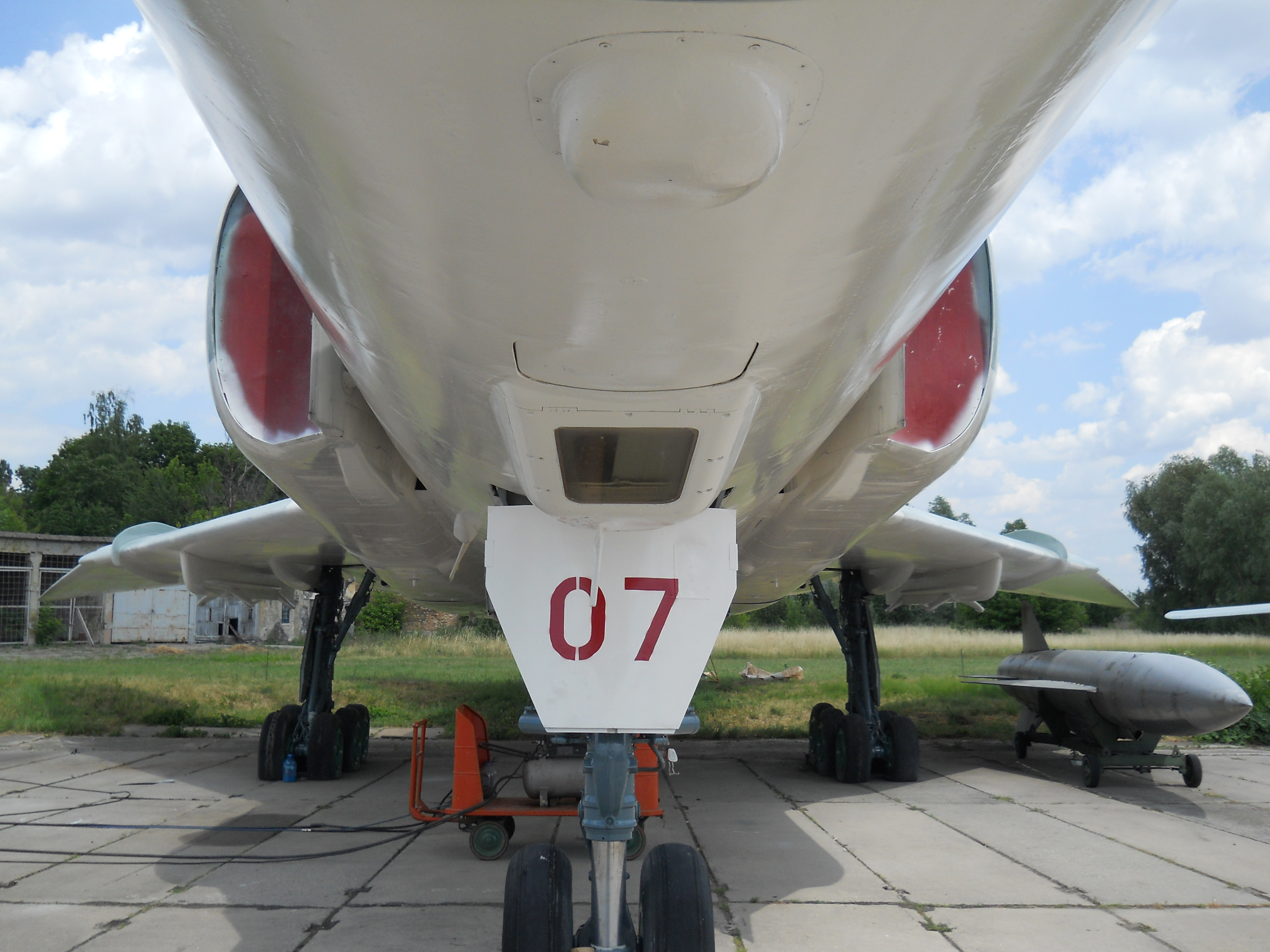
OBP-15T Targeting bombsight on Tupolev Tu-22M(0)

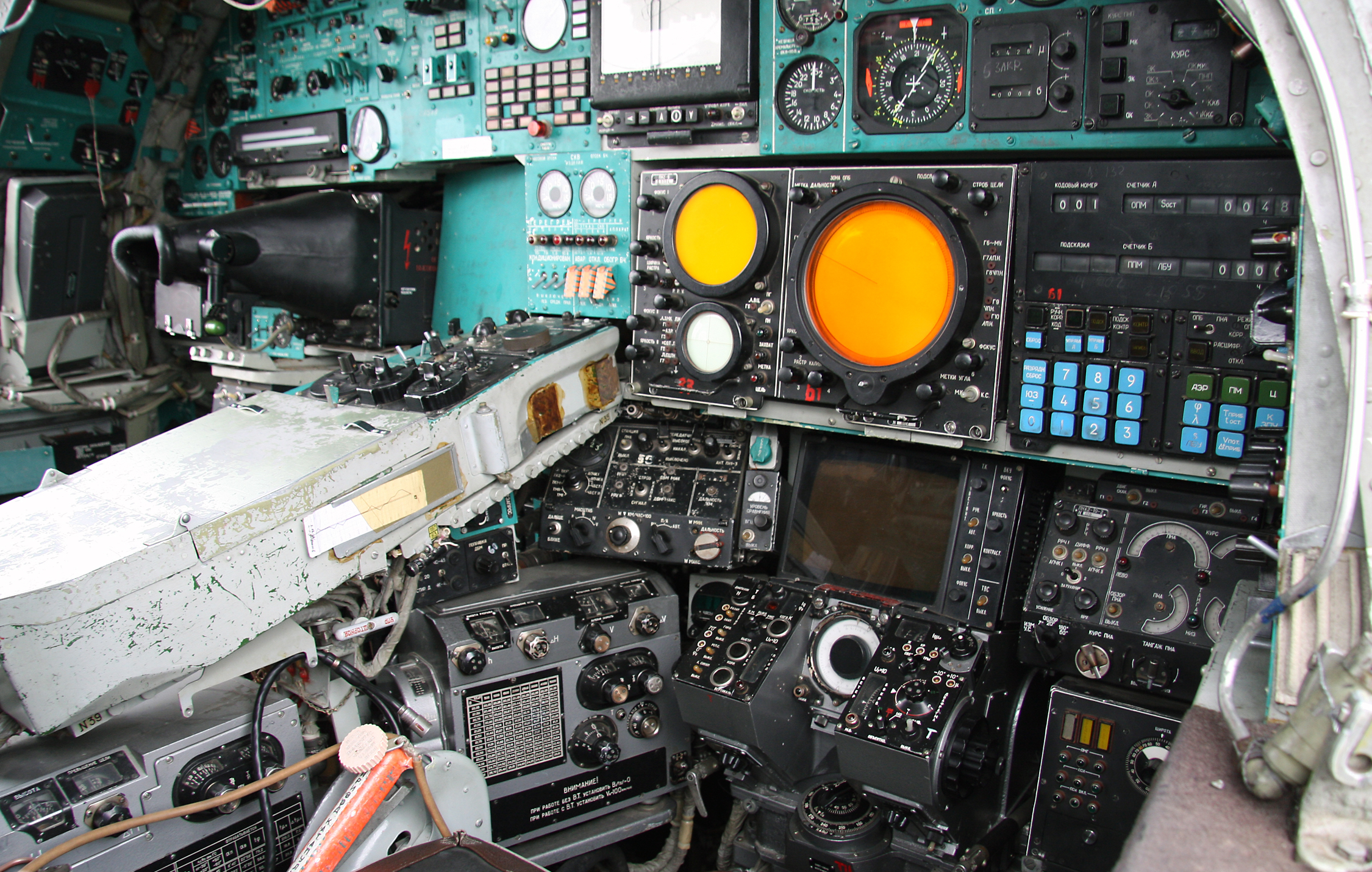
Older cockpit of Tupolev Tu-22M3 bomber, navigator's and weapon systems officer's panels

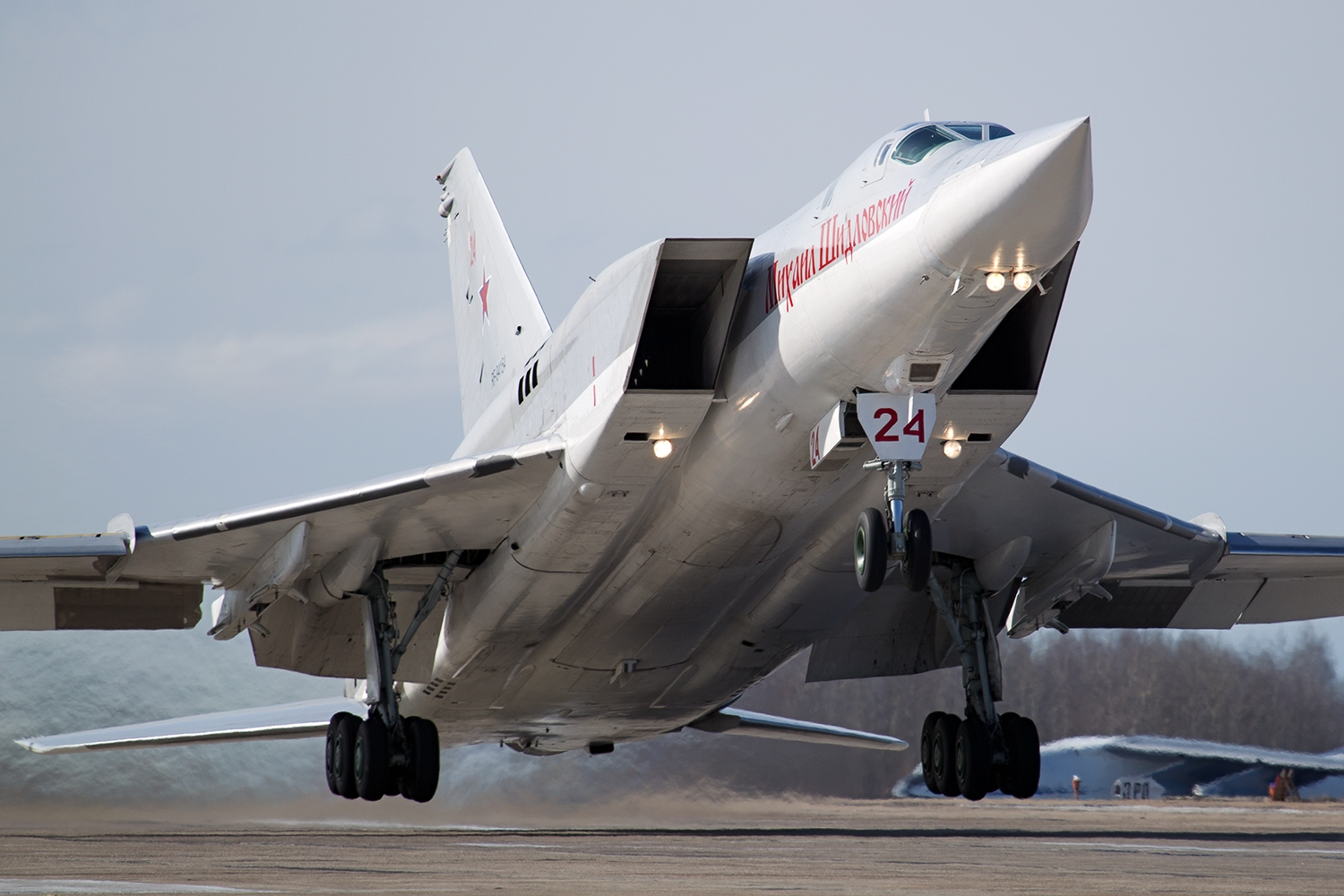
Tupolev Tu-22M3 taking off at Ryazan Dyagilevo

Compared to the T-4, it was an evolutionary design, and thus its appeal lay in its simplicity and low cost. The Soviet government was skeptical about the need to approve the development of a replacement aircraft so soon after the Tu-22 had entered service. The Air Force and Tupolev, in order to save face regarding the Tu-22's operational deficiencies and to stave off criticisms from the ICBM lobby, agreed to pass off the design as an update of the Tu-22 in their discussions with the government. The aircraft was designated Tu-22M, given the OKB code "Aircraft 45", and an internal designation of "AM". Their effort was successful as the government approved the design on 28 November 1967, and decreed the development of the aircraft's main weapon, the Kh-22 missile. The T-4 itself made its first flight in 1972, but was later cancelled.

US intelligence had been aware of the existence of the aircraft since 1969, and the first satellite photograph of the bomber was taken in 1970. The existence of the aircraft was a shock to US intelligence as Nikita Khrushchev, who had been the Soviet premier up to 1964, was adamant that ICBMs would render the bomber obsolete.

As in the case of its contemporaries, the MiG-23 and Su-17 projects, the advantages of variable-sweep wing (or "swing wing") seemed attractive, allowing a combination of short take-off performance, efficient cruising, and good high-speed, low-level flight. The result was a new swing-wing aircraft named Samolyot 145 (Aeroplane 145), derived from the Tupolev Tu-22, with some features borrowed from the abandoned Tu-98 project. The Tu-22M was based on the Tu-22's weapon system and used its Kh-22 missile. The Tu-22M designation was used to help get approval for the bomber within the Soviet military and government system.

The Tu-22M designation was used by the Soviet Union during the SALT II arms control negotiations, creating the impression that it was a modification of the Tu-22. Some suggested that the designation was deliberately deceptive, and intended to hide the Tu-22M's performance. Other sources suggest the "deception" was internal to make it easier to get budgets approved. According to some sources, the Backfire-B/C production variants were believed to be designated Tu-26 by Russia, although this is disputed by many others. The US State and Defense Departments have used the Tu-22M designation for the Backfire.

Production of all Tu-22M variants totalled 497, including pre-production aircraft.

=== Modernization ===
An initial attempt at modernizing the Tu-22M, Adaptation-45.03M, based on modernizing the aircraft's radar, began in 1990, but was abandoned before reaching production. In 2007, work began on a new radar for the Tu-22M, the NV-45, which was first flown on a Tu-22M in 2008, with four more repaired Tu-22Ms refitted with NV-45 radars in 2014–2015.

A contract for a full mid-life upgrade, the Tu-22M3M, was signed in September 2014. The aircraft was then planned to receive a further modified NV-45M radar, together with new navigation equipment and a modified flight control system. A new self-defense electronic radar suite was to be fitted, replacing the tail gun of the existing Tu-22M3. Much of the new avionics were planned to be shared with the upgraded Tu-160M2. As of 2018, armament was planned to be enhanced by adding the new Kh-32 missile, a heavily modified version of the current Kh-22, the subsonic Kh-SD, the hypersonic Kh-MT, or the Kh-47M2 Kinzhal missiles. In 2018, deliveries of the Tu-22M3M were expected to begin in 2021.

On 11 May 2020, it was reported by TASS, citing anonymous sources in the military-industrial complex, that a test launch of a new hypersonic missile, not belonging to the Kh-32 family, was conducted from a Tu-22M3M. Reportedly, work on the missile had been initiated several years earlier, and its tests were expected to be completed "simultaneously with the work on the upgraded Tu-22M3M bomber".

A separate, simpler, upgrade program (SVP-24-22) was being carried out in 2008 by the company Gefest & T, based on avionics developed for the Sukhoi Su-24 attack aircraft, including a new computer, a new navigation system and digital processing for the aircraft's radar. The upgrade is claimed to greatly increase navigation accuracy and bomb delivery. A SVP-24-22-equipped Tu-22M underwent trials in 2009, and the program was moved into production, with deliveries after 2012.

In September 2023, it was reported that the Tu-22M3 have been modified to carry a missile with a payload capacity of 1,700 kg (3,700 lb).

== Operational history ==
=== Soviet Union ===
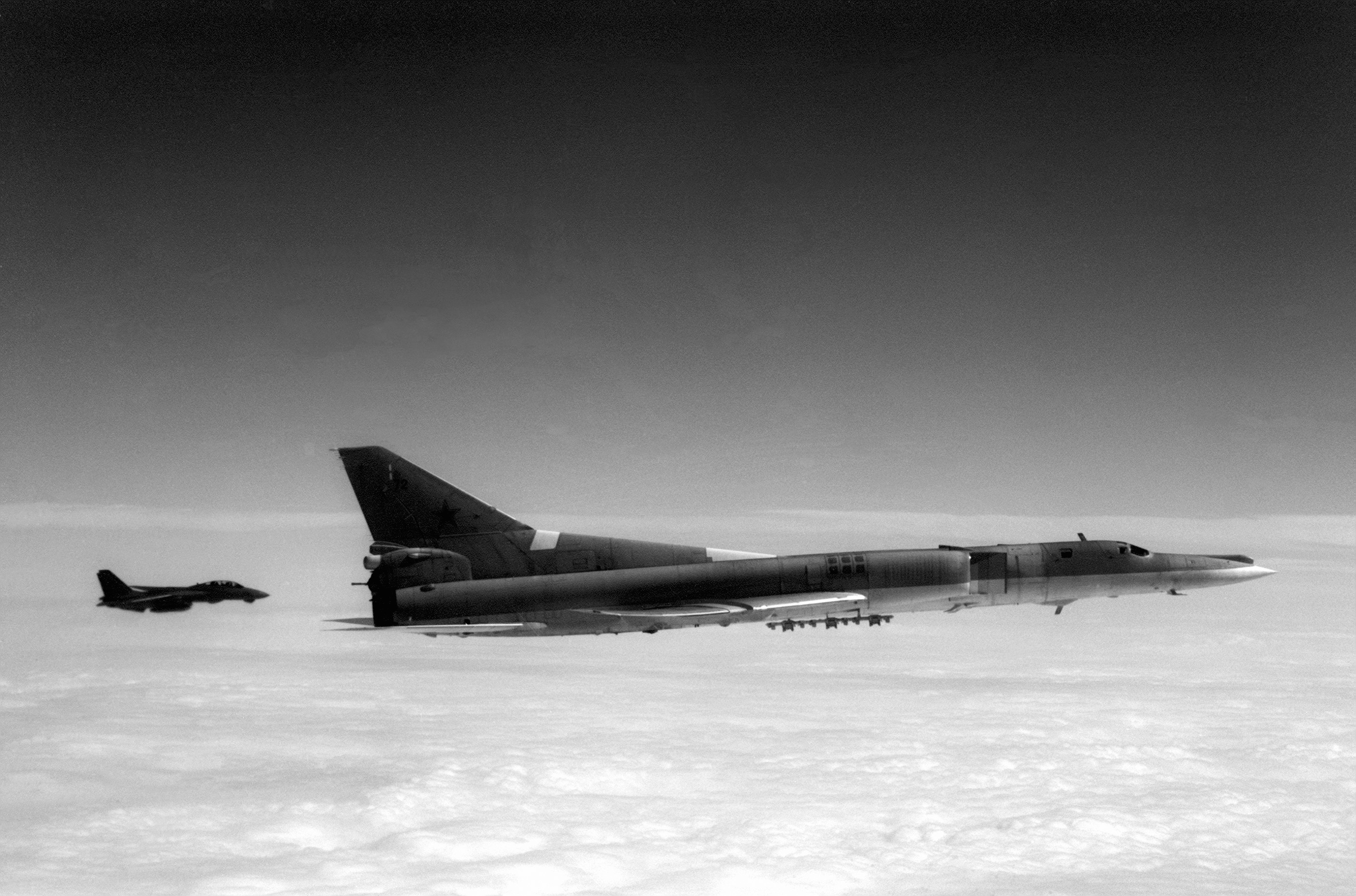
Soviet Tu-22M1 Backfire-B bomber aircraft is escorted by an F-14A Tomcat aircraft.

The two prototypes Tu-22M(0) were delivered to Long Range Aviation's 42nd Combat Training Centre at Dyagilevo air base, near Ryazan, in February 1973. The aircraft began practice sorties in March. Within 20 days of the aircraft's delivery, the air and ground crew at the air base had received their type ratings; this was helped by their earlier training at Tupolev, the Gromov Flight Research Institute and the Kazan plant. In June that year, the aircraft were demonstrated to Soviet government officials, destroying tanks and armoured personnel carriers.

The Tu-22M was first unveiled in 1980 during the aircraft's participation in a major Warsaw Pact exercise. During the exercise, naval Tu-22M2s conducted anti-ship operations by mining parts of the Baltic Sea to simulate an amphibious landing. The exercise was extensively covered by the press and TV media. In June 1981, four Tu-22Ms were intercepted and photographed by Norwegian aircraft flying over the Norwegian Sea.

The first simulated attack by the Tu-22M against a NATO carrier group occurred between 30 September and 1 October 1982. Eight aircraft locked onto the U.S. task forces of USS Enterprise and USS Midway which were operating in the North Pacific. They came within 120 mi (200 km) of the task forces. The reaction of the U.S. Navy was thought to have been restrained during this event so as to allow the observation of the Tu-22M's tactics. The bomber also made attempts to test Japan's air defense boundary on several occasions.

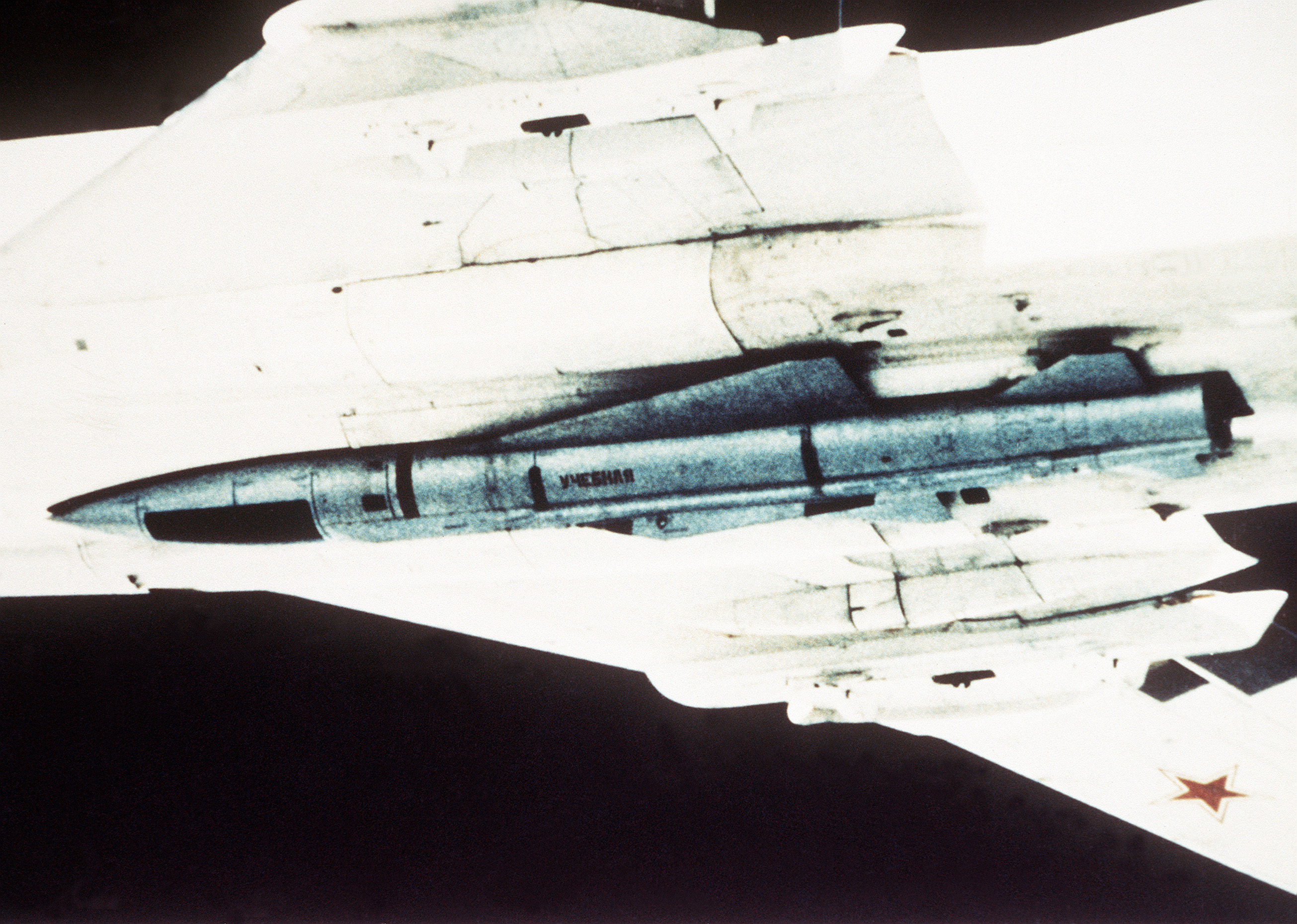
A Raduga Kh-22 anti-ship missile under a Tupolev Tu-22M(0)

The Tu-22M was first used in combat in Afghanistan. It was deployed December 1987 to January 1988, during which the aircraft flew strike missions in support of the Soviet Army's attempt to relieve the Mujahideens' Siege of Khost. Two squadrons of aircraft from the 185th GvBAP based at Poltava were deployed to Maryy-2 air base in Turkmenistan. Capable of dropping large tonnages of conventional ordnance, the aircraft bombed enemy forts, bases and material supplies. In October 1988, the aircraft was again deployed against the Mujahideen. Sixteen Tu-22M3s were used to provide cover to Soviet forces that were pulling out of the country. The Tu-22Ms were tasked with destroying paths of access to Soviet forces, attacking enemy forces at night to prevent regrouping, and to attack incoming supplies from Iran and Pakistan. Working alongside 30 newly arrived MiG-27s, the aircraft also flew missions aimed at relieving the besieged city of Kandahar. The aircraft had its last Afghan operation in January 1989 at Salang pass.

The Tu-22M suffered from widespread maintenance problems due to poor manufacturing quality during its service with the Soviet forces. The engines and airframes in particular had short service lives. The Air Force at one point sought to prosecute Tupolev for allegedly rushing the inadequate designs of the Tu-22M and the Tu-160 into service. This was compounded by the government bureaucracy, which hampered the provision of spare parts to allow the servicing of the Tu-22M. With some aircraft grounded for up to six months, the mission-capable rate of the aircraft in August 1991 was around 30–40%.

=== Russia ===
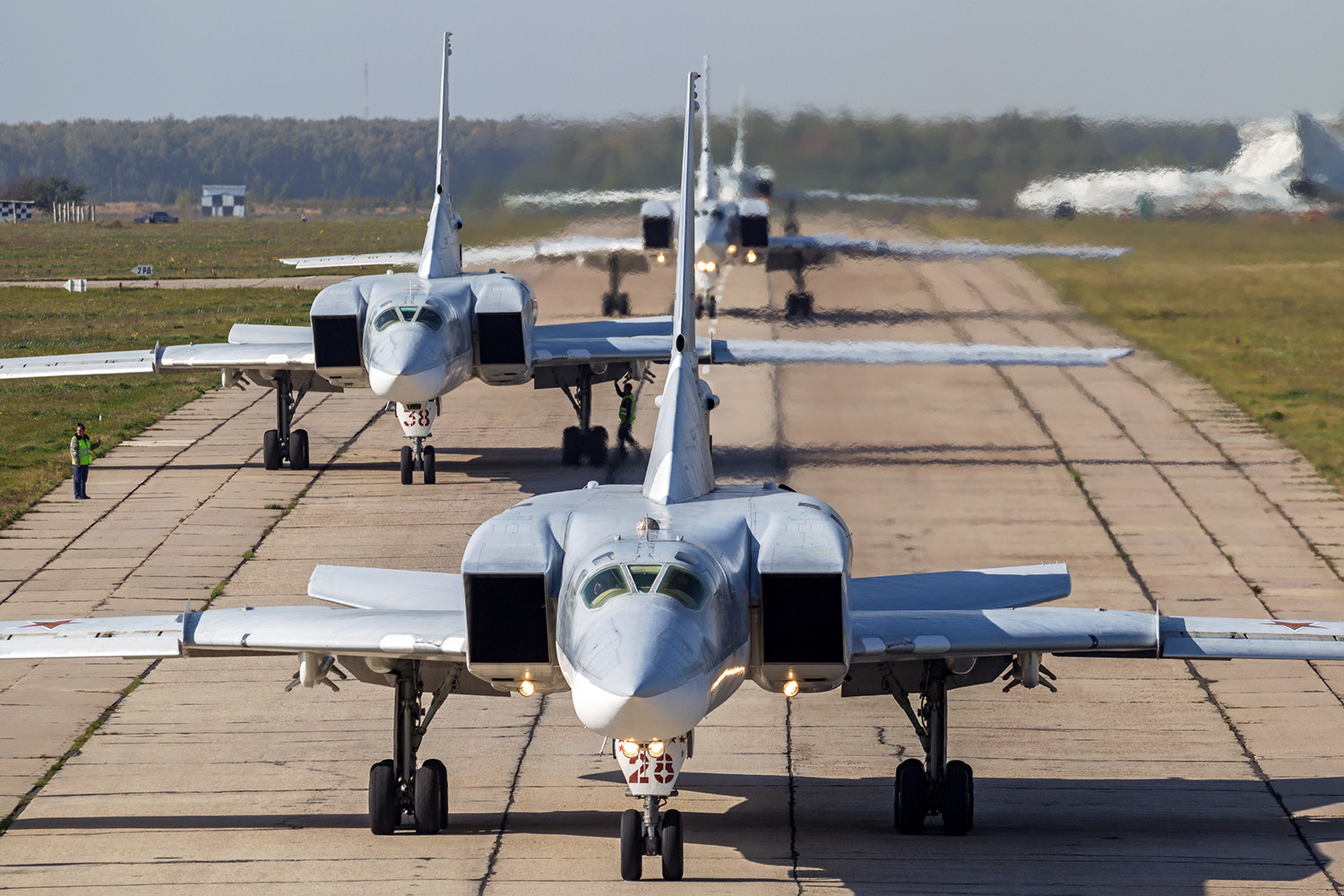
Tupolev Tu-22M3 at Ryazan Dyagilevo

At the time of the dissolution of the Soviet Union, 370 remained in Commonwealth of Independent States service. Production ended in 1993.

The Russian Federation used the Tu-22M3 in combat in Chechnya during 1995, performing strikes near Grozny.

In February 2001, Japan claimed two Tu-22Ms had violated its airspace near Rebun Island, Hokkaido.

In August 2007, the Tu-22M and the Tu-95 began conducting long-range patrolling, for the first time since 1992.

On 9 August 2008, a Russian Tu-22MR reconnaissance aircraft was shot down in South Ossetia by a Georgian air defence Buk-M1 surface-to-air-missile system during the 5–day Russo-Georgian War. One of its crew members was captured (Major Vyacheslav Malkov), two others were killed and the crew commander, Lt. Col. Aleksandr Koventsov, was missing in action.

In February 2013, Tu-22Ms simulated a strike on a US Aegis Ballistic Missile Defense System cruiser and ground-based radar in Japan. This was speculated as the AN/TPY-2 transportable radar of the US 10th Missile Defence Battery in Shariki, Aomori.

On 29 March 2013, two Tu-22M3 bombers flying in international airspace made a simulated attack on Sweden. The Swedish air defense failed to respond. Two Tu-22Ms flew supersonic over the Baltic Sea on 24 March 2015. Two Tu-22Ms approached Öland in international airspace on 21 May 2015. The Swedish Air Force sent two Saab JAS 39 Gripen fighters to mark their presence. On 4 July 2015, two Tu-22Ms approached the Swedish island of Gotland without violating its airspace, followed by Swedish and other fighter aircraft.

Tupolev Tu-22M3 during Center 2019 exercise

In 2014, Russian aerospace expert Piotr Butowski estimated there were seven squadrons of Tu-22Ms in service, each with approximately 10 aircraft, stationed at three airbases; 40 at Belaya airbase in southeastern Siberia, 28 at Shaykovka airbase southwest of Moscow, and 10 at Dyagilevo airbase in Ryazan southeast of Moscow which serves as the training unit for the bomber. With the removal of the aircraft's in-flight refueling capability due to the START I treaty, the Tu-22M's internal fuel capacity limits its operational range (combat radius unrefueled: 4,000–5,000 km (DIA), 3,360–3,960 km (CIA) estimate) from its home bases to only around Russia's immediate sphere of influence.

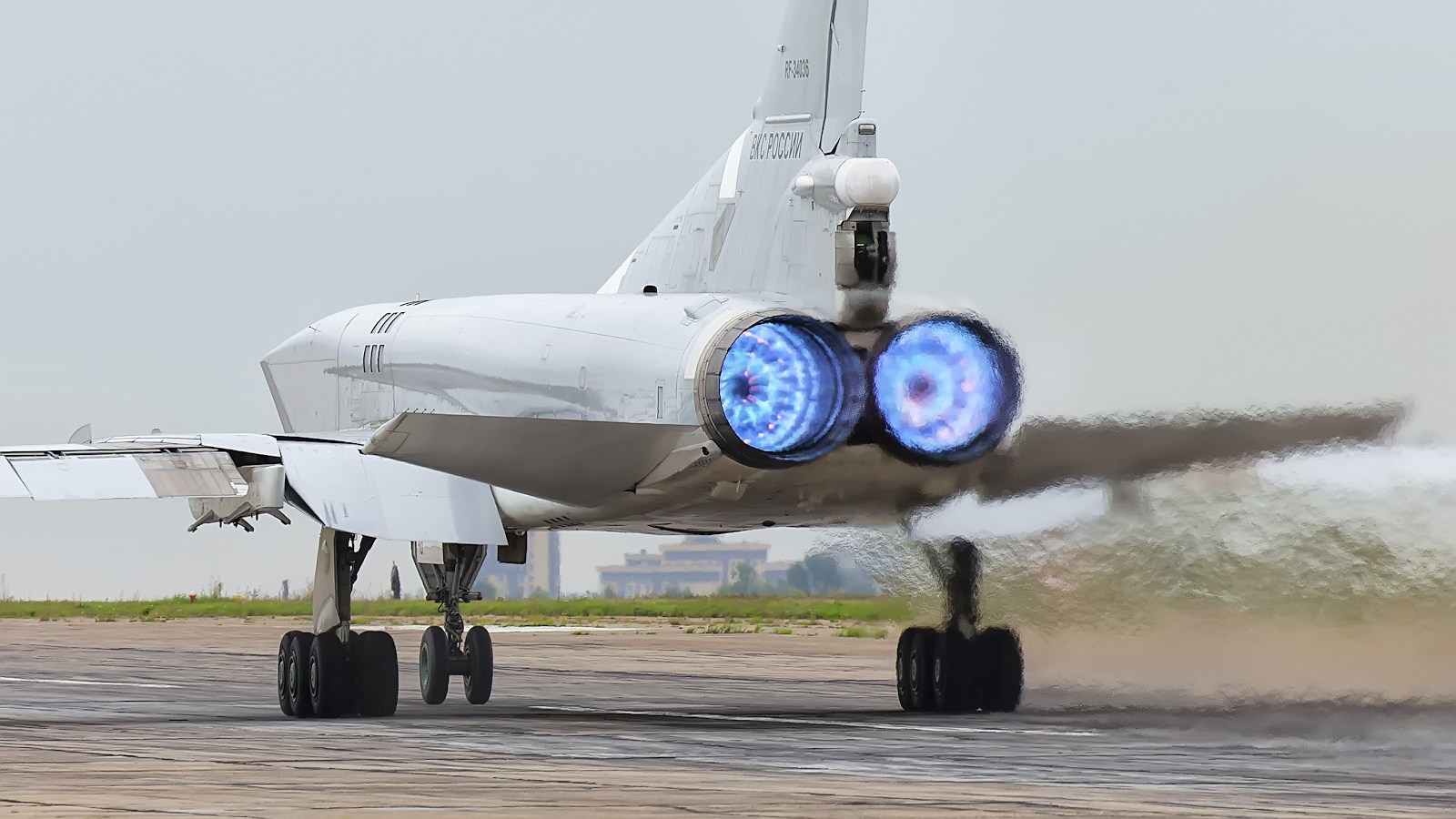
Tupolev Tu-22M3 taking off with afterburner in 2021

==== Syrian Civil War ====
Since late January 2017, six Tu-22M3s resumed airstrikes in the area of Deir ez-Zor to prevent capture of the city by jihadists and again in late 2017 to support a government offensive. 22–31 January 2016, Tu-22M3s reportedly conducted 42 sorties performing airstrikes in the vicinity of Deir ez-Zor. On the morning of 12 July 2016, six Tu-22M3 bombers carried out a concentrated attack around Palmyra, Al-Sukhnah and Arak. On 14 July, six Tu-22M3 bombers operating from airfields in Russia delivered another massive strike on the newly detected IS facilities in the areas east of Palmyra, as well as in Al-Sukhnah, Arak, and the T-3 oil pumping station in the province of Homs. New raids were conducted on 21 July, 8 August, 11 August, and 14 August 2016.

On 16 August 2016, the bombers began to fly missions in Syria using Iran's Hamedan Airbase.

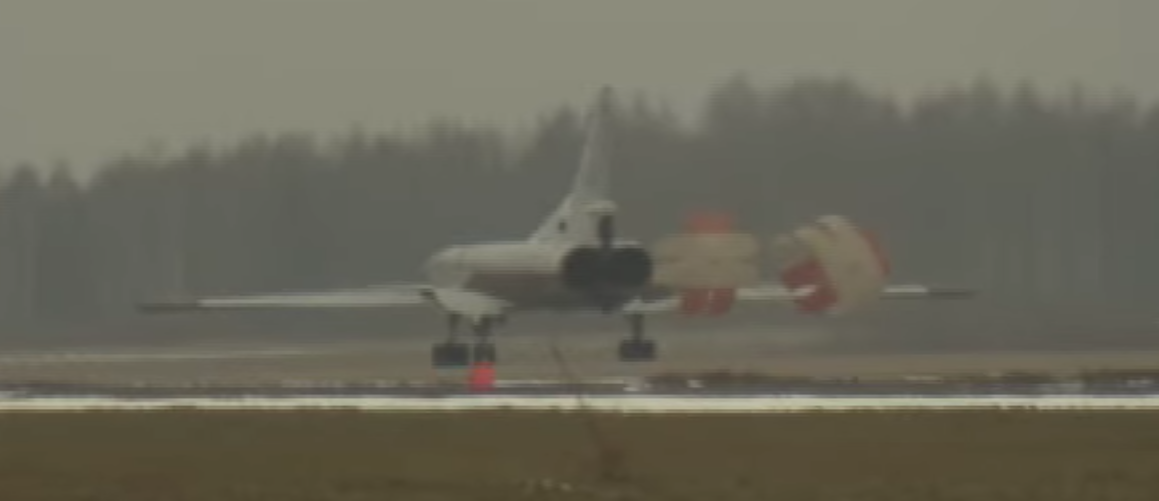
Tu-22M3 landing with two drag chutes at Shaykovka air base near Kirov, Kaluga Oblast in 2017 after deployment in Syria

In November 2017, six Tu-22M3s resumed airstrikes in the area of Deir ez-Zor to support a government offensive. On December 12, 2017, a fleet of Tu-22M3 bombers arrived back from Syria at Shaykovka air base near Kirov, Kaluga Oblast, where lieutenant general and long-range-aviation commander Sergey Kobylash awarded crews with the medal "Participant of the military operation in Syria".

In May 2021, three Tu-22Ms were temporarily deployed to the Khmeymim airbase in Syria. Tu-22Ms were again deployed in eastern Mediterranean in June of the same year for large RF Navy and Air Force drills.

==== Invasion of Ukraine ====
On 15 April 2022, the Ukrainian Defence Ministry stated Russia had used Tu-22M3 bombers for the first time since the start of its invasion of Ukraine, to strike targets in Mariupol. It had earlier been reported that FAB-3000M-46 dumb bombs had been reactivated in Russia for use with Tu-22M3 bombers to strike targets at the Azovstal iron and steel works plant that became the last bastion for Ukrainian troops in the besieged city of Mariupol.

On 11 May 2022, a video emerged on social media showing a Russian Aerospace Forces Tu-22M3 bomber launching two Kh-22 missiles at targets somewhere in Ukraine.

On 5 December 2022, a Russian Aerospace Forces Tu-22M3 bomber, identified as RF-34110, was shown damaged as a result of a long-range drone attack by the Armed Forces of Ukraine against the Dyagilevo air base. Images on social media showed at least the engine outputs and the trailing edge of the stabilizers damaged.

On 20 August 2023, the Russian government confirmed a drone attack on an airbase in Novgorod and BBC News subsequently published verified images of a Tu-22M3 engulfed in flames at Soltsy air base, Russia, which had been attacked by drones on the day before.

According to Ukraine, one Tu-22M3 was destroyed, and two were disabled, in an operation of a Ukrainian intelligence unit led by Oleh Babiy in August 2023.

During the 29 December 2023 Russian strikes on Ukraine and other attacks, some 300 Kh-22 missiles have been launched at Ukraine by Russian forces, all by Tu-22M bombers. None have been shot down by Ukrainian forces, although it is suggested that Russia has been targeting areas where there are no MIM-104 Patriot or SAMP/T missile batteries.

On 19 April 2024, a Russian Tu-22M3 crashed near Stavropol, over 450 km of distance from the nearest Ukrainian controlled territory as of the time of the event. Ukraine claimed to have shot down the long-range strategic bomber about 300 km from Ukraine as it was reportedly trying to return to base after a combat sortie. Russian authorities claimed the aircraft crashed in Krasnogvardeysky District due to a technical malfunction, killing one crew member, with another missing. A source claimed that Ukraine's Main Directorate of Intelligence had planned and executed the downing with a S-200 missile, the same type of missile Ukraine claimed to have shot down a Beriev A-50 in February 2024. If confirmed, it would be Ukraine's first downing of a Tu-22M in the air. Ukraine "likely destroyed" one Tu-22M at an airbase in Novgorod Oblast in August 2023, using drones.

HUR drones struck the Olenya air base in Murmansk Oblast, some 1,800 kilometers from the Ukrainian border, damaging two Tu-22M3s. A Ukrainian spokesman said, "We can confirm the damage to two Tu-22M3 aircraft. We are talking about aircraft No. 33 and No. 31. No. 33 has holes in the upper part of the fuselage, and aircraft No. 31 also has some body damage."

On 31 March 2025, Ukrainian drones destroyed Kh-22 missiles at Shaykovka air base according to satellite imagery. Ukrainian military commander Oleksandr Syrskyi said that a drone managed to destroy a Tu-22M3 after it landed. General Syrskyi said it was valued at $100 million.

On 1 June 2025, at least four Tu-22M3 bombers were destroyed in the Operation Spiderweb attack at Belaya Air Base near Irkutsk.

=== Export ===
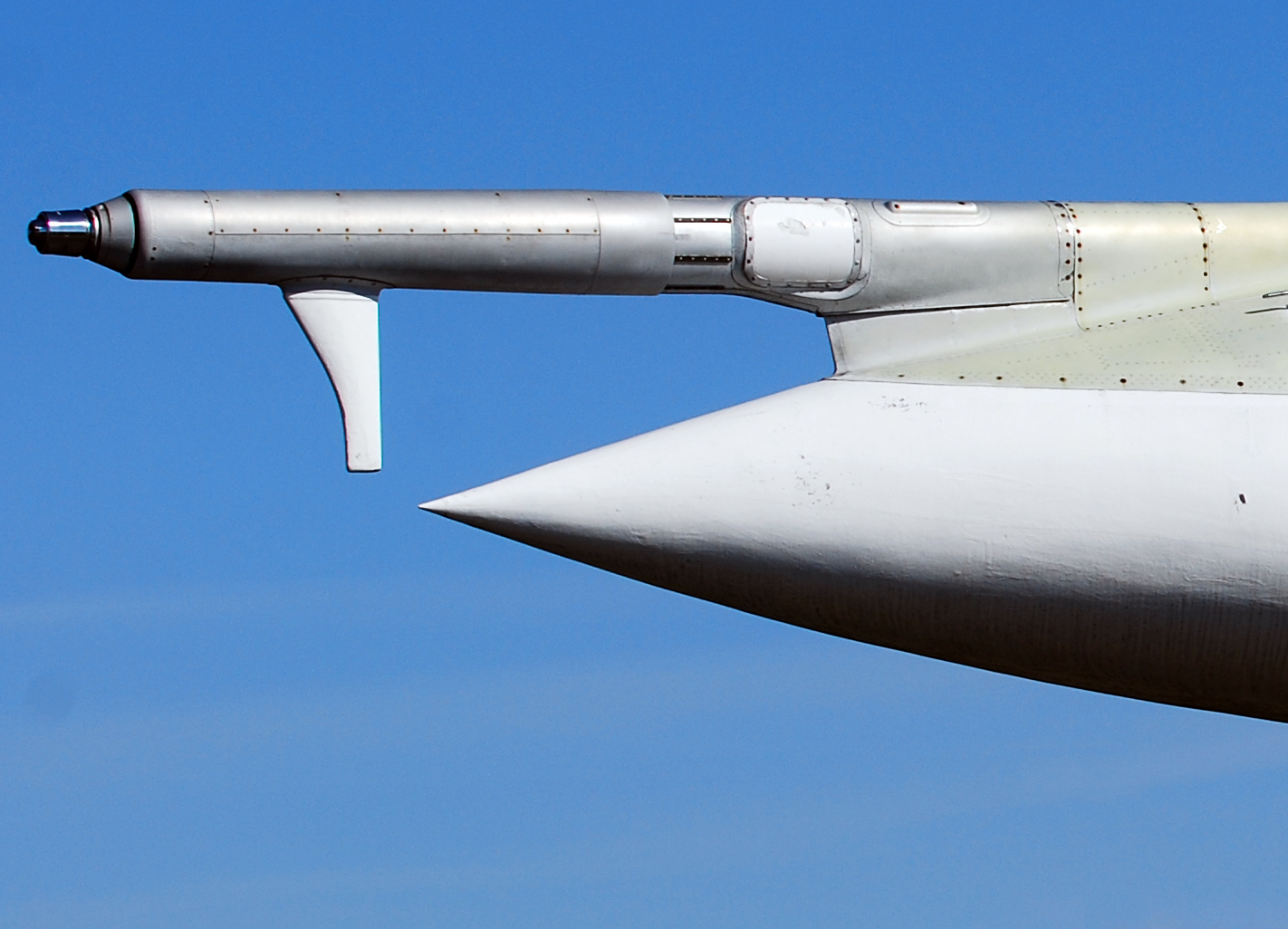
Closeup of the proprietary refuelling probe on the Tu-22M1 nose

The Tupolev company has sought export customers for the Tu-22M since 1992, with possible customers including Iran, India and the People's Republic of China, but no sales have apparently been made. Unlike the Tu-22 bomber, Tu-22Ms were not exported to Middle East countries.

During 1999, India reportedly signed a lease-to-buy contract for four Tu-22M aircraft for maritime reconnaissance and strike purposes, which were to enter IAF service in 2001. At the time, the aircraft were to be delivered with Kh-22 cruise missiles. As of 2026 there is no evidence of operation or acquisition by the Indian Air Force.

== Variants ==
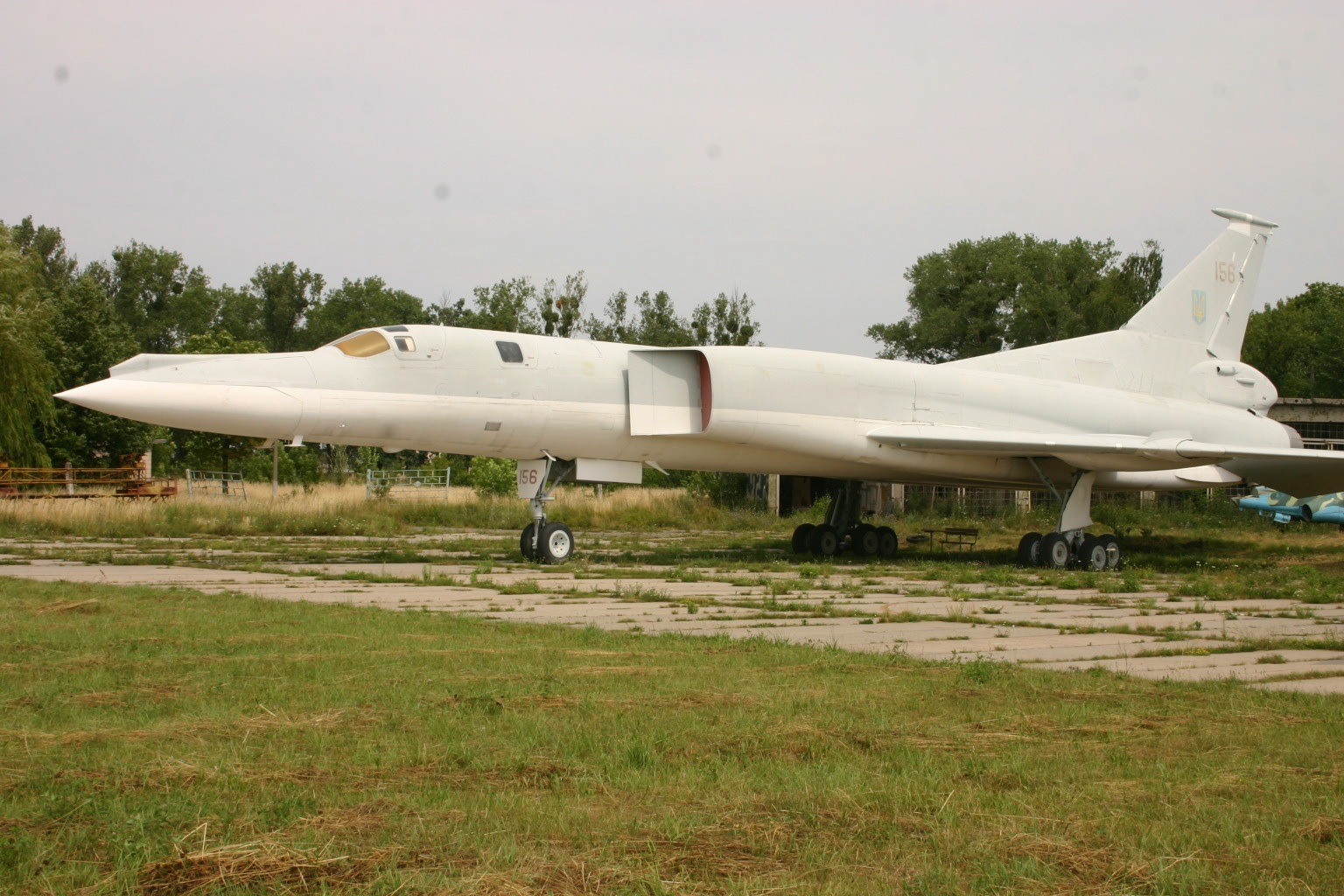
Earliest Tu-22M(0) modification

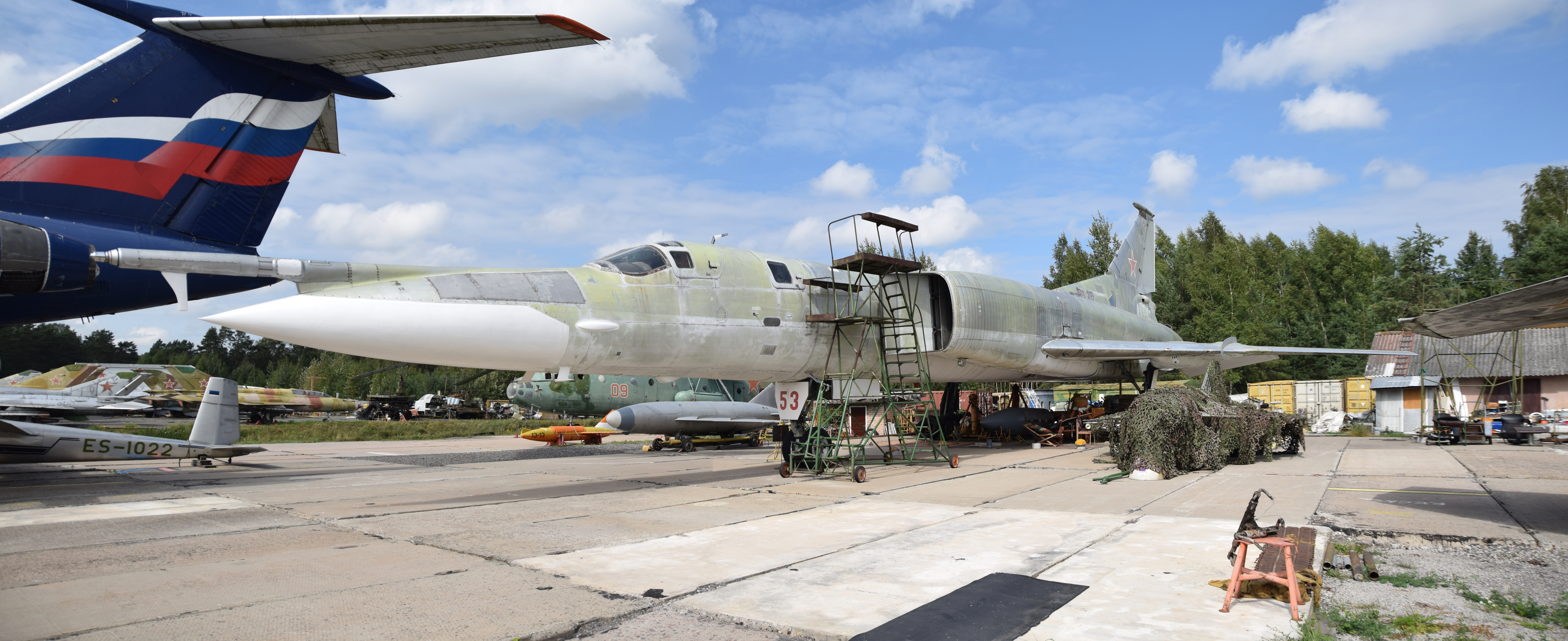
Tupolev Tu-22M1 modification

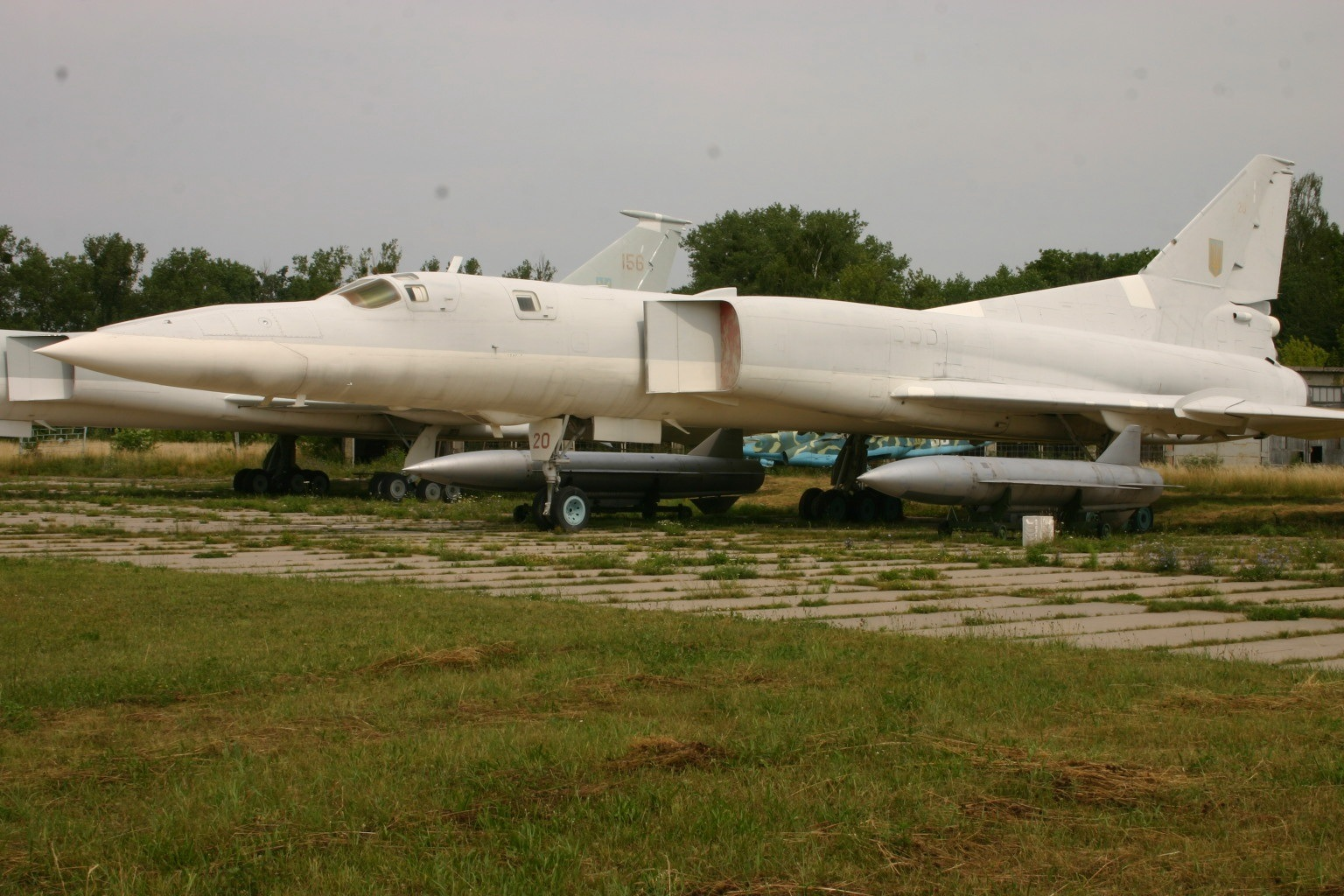
Tu-22M2 modification

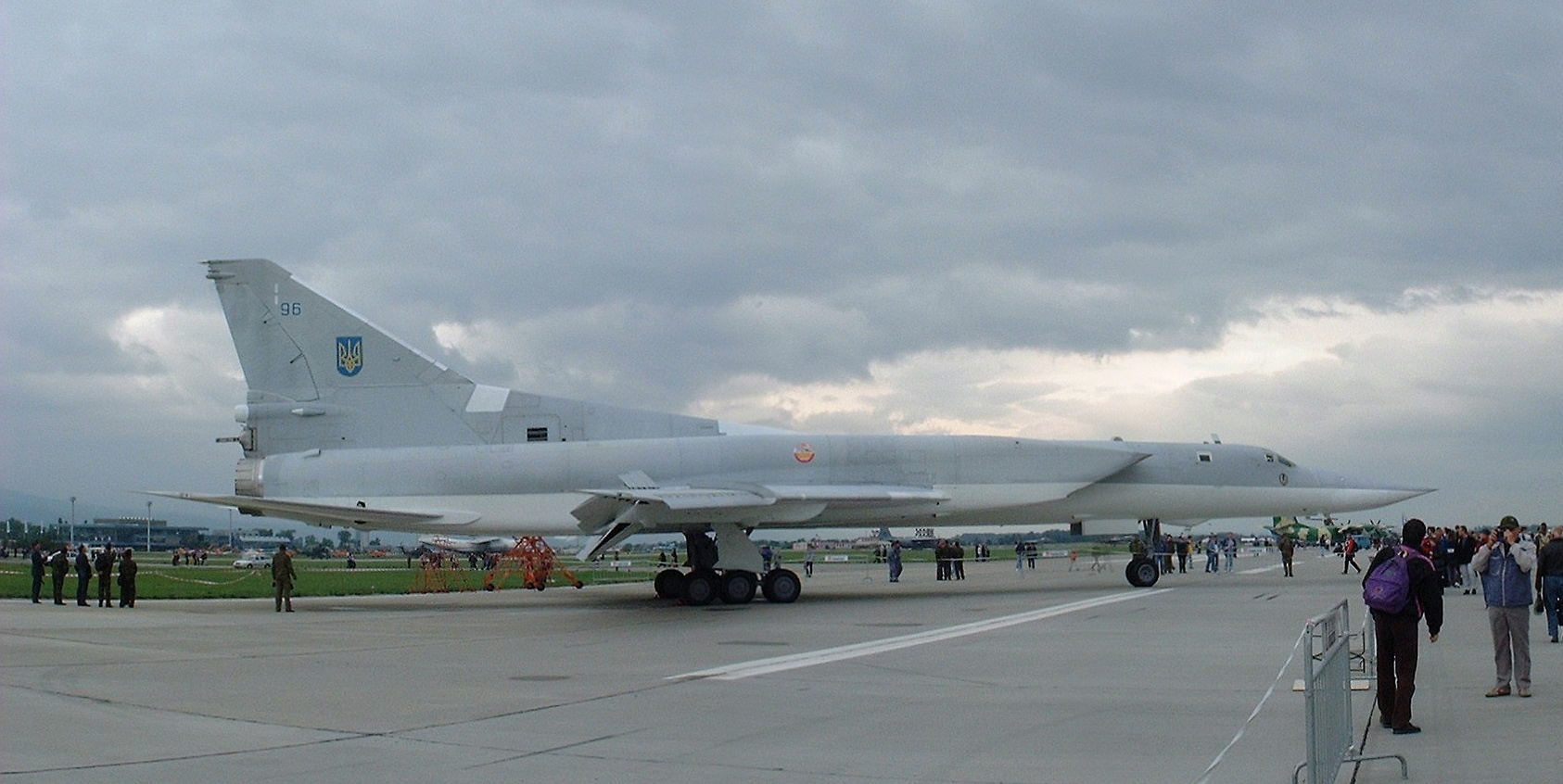
A Ukrainian Air Force Tu-22M3 at SIAD 2002 Air Show, Bratislava, Slovakia

Tu-22M(0)
Earliest pre-production variant, 9 were produced.
Tu-22M1
Pilot-production aircraft, 9 were produced in 1971 and 1972. Its NATO reporting name was Backfire-A.
Tu-22M2
The first major production version, entering production in 1972, was the Tu-22M2 (NATO: Backfire-B), with longer wings and an extensively redesigned, area ruled fuselage (raising the crew complement to four), twin NK-22 engines (215 kN thrust each) with distinctive intake ramps, and new undercarriage with the main landing gear in the wing glove rather than in large pods. 211 Tu-22M2 were built from 1972 to 1984. On November 1, 1984, the last Tu-22M2 of the 58th series rolled out of the factory gates.
The Tu-22M2 had a top speed of Mach 1.65 and was armed most commonly with long-range cruise missiles/anti-ship missiles, typically one or two Raduga Kh-22 anti-ship missiles. Some Tu-22M2s were later reequipped with more powerful NK-23 engines and redesignated Tu-22M2Ye.
Tu-22M3
The later Tu-22M3 (NATO: Backfire-C), which first flew in 1977, was introduced into operation in 1983 and officially entered service in 1989, had new NK-25 engines with substantially more power, wedge-shaped intake ramps similar to the MiG-25, wings with greater maximum sweep and a recontoured nose housing a new Almaz PNA (Planeta Nositel, izdeliye 030A) navigation/attack (NATO 'Down Beat') radar and NK-45 nav/attack system, which provides much-improved low-altitude flight. The aerodynamic changes increased its top speed to Mach 2.05 and its range by one third compared to the Tu-22M2. It has a revised tail turret with a single cannon, and provision for an internal rotary launcher for the Raduga Kh-15 missile, similar to the American AGM-69 SRAM. It was nicknamed Troika ('Trio' or third) in Russian service. 268 were built until 1993.
As built, the Tu-22M included the provision for a retractable probe in the upper part of the nose for aerial refueling. The probe was reportedly removed as a result of the SALT negotiations, because with refueling it was considered an intercontinental range strategic bomber. The probe can be reinstalled if needed.
Tu-22M3s used to attack targets in Syria underwent modernization, during which the SVP-24-22 specialized computing subsystems were installed on them, significantly increasing the accuracy of the bombing.
Tu-22M4
The development of the "Izdeliye 4510" began in 1983. It was a modernization with the installation of new NK-32 engines (from the Tu-160) and with a change in engine air intakes. The avionics were modernized by installing a new PNK, the Obzor ("Overview") radar from the Tu-160 and electronic warfare systems. The range of weapons was expanded: 3 Kh-32 or 10 Kh-15 (with placement on 6 internal and 4 external points of suspension) or UPAB-1500 with a television guidance system. In 1990, a prototype was built at the Kazan aircraft factory. Works in this direction were discontinued in November 1991. The prototype aircraft No. 4504 is in the museum exposition of the Dyagilevo air base.
Tu-22MR
Several Tu-22M3s, perhaps 12, were converted to Tu-22M3(R) or Tu-22MR standard with the Shompol side looking airborne radar and other ELINT equipment.
Tu-22DP
Tu-22DP (Dal'nego Perekhvata, long-range interception)/ DP-1 was a long-range interceptor project based on the Tu-22M2 (later on the basis of the Tu-22M3). R & D was conducted by the AN Tupolev Design Bureau together with GosNIIAS. It was assumed that the DP could also carry strike weapons.
Tu-344
A canceled civilian supersonic aircraft based on the Tu-22M3, designed to carry 10–12 passengers. Developed by Tupolev Design Bureau (ANTK named after A. Tupolev) within the framework of conversion program in the second half of the 1990s. The development of the aircraft began in the 1990s with the emergence of interest and demand for supersonic business jets (SBJ). Since the creation of an aircraft from scratch requires a large investment, Tupolev Design Bureau decided to create an SBJ-class aircraft based on Tu-22M3. However, the project proved to be unpromising at the time, as the aircraft was supposed to be used internationally, but did not meet international environmental standards of the day.
Tu-22M3 with SVP-24-22
Modernized Tu-22M3 of the Russian Aerospace Forces fitted with a new sighting and computing system SVP-24-22 Gefest, instead of the NK-45 Vakhta-2 complex. The SVP-24-22 includes a new and more powerful SV-24 onboard computer, UVV-MP-22 input-output device, flight information generation unit – BFI, aviation collimator indicator KAI-24, radio navigation system SRNS-24 with the A737 satellite receiver and the solid-state information storage device TBN-K-2 to save data of the navigation-targeting complex SVP-24-22 and of the flight recorder. 5 modernized aircraft entered service in 2015, 2 in 2017, 1 in 2018, 2 in 2019 and 2 in 2022.
Tu-22M3M
Tu-22M3 for the Russian Aerospace Forces with engines from Tu-160M2 (NK-32-02), 80 percent of avionics are replaced or upgraded, including SVP-24-22 bombsights, a phased array NV-45 radar, GLONASS navigation system, modern digital glass cockpit and engine controls, electronic warfare countermeasures, and the ability to use precision air-to-surface weapons. The modernization also counts with installation of mid-air refueling equipment, removed from existing aircraft in 1979 under the SALT II agreement, that will significantly increase the combat radius of the bomber. The Russian Ministry of Defense intends to upgrade up to 30 aircraft out of approximately 60 Tu-22M3s currently in service to the advanced Tu-22M3M variant. Can carry 3 Kh-32 or 4 Kh-47M2 Kinzhal missiles. Service life will be extended to 40–45 years. On 16 August 2018, the first modernized aircraft was unveiled during a roll-out ceremony at the Kazan Aviation Plant. It performed its maiden flight on 28 December 2018. On 20 March 2020, the second modernized Tu-22M3M aircraft had its maiden flight. On 27 May 2020, it was reported that an upgraded Tu-22M3M strategic bomber had undergone trials at supersonic speed during its fourth test flight out of five already conducted.

== Operators ==
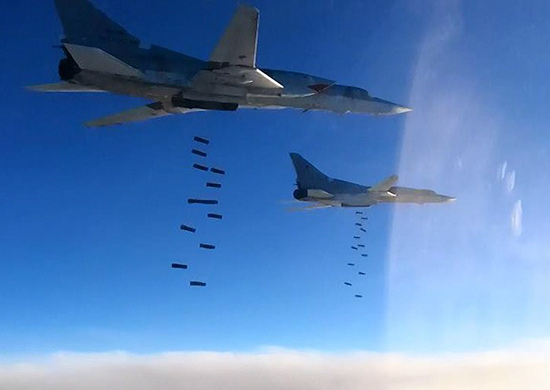
Russian Tu-22M3 group airstrike in Syria

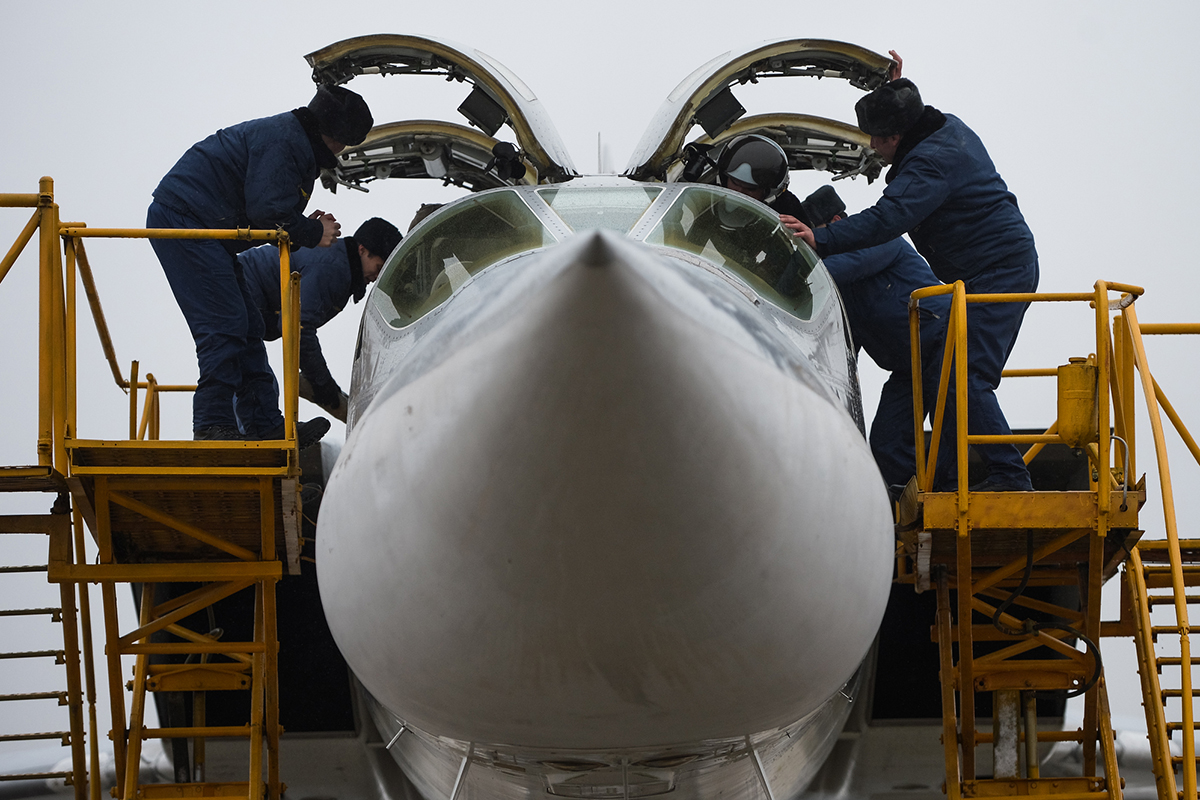
Open Tu-22M3 hatches at Shaykovka after Syria deployment

Russia

- Russian Aerospace Forces – 55 Tu-22M3, 1 Tu-22MR (in overhaul).
  - Olenya (air base)
    - 40th Mixed Aviation Regiment
  - 6952nd Air Base – Belaya (air base), Irkutsk Oblast
    - Elements of 326th Heavy Bomber Aviation Division (HQ: Ukrainka)
  - 43rd Center for Combat Application and Training of Aircrew for Long Range Aviation – Dyagilevo (air base), Ryazan Oblast
    - 1st Instructor Heavy Bomber Aviation Regiment
  - Shaykovka (air base), Kaluga Oblast
    - 52nd Heavy Bomber Regiment of the 22nd Guards Heavy Bomber Aviation Division

=== Former operators ===
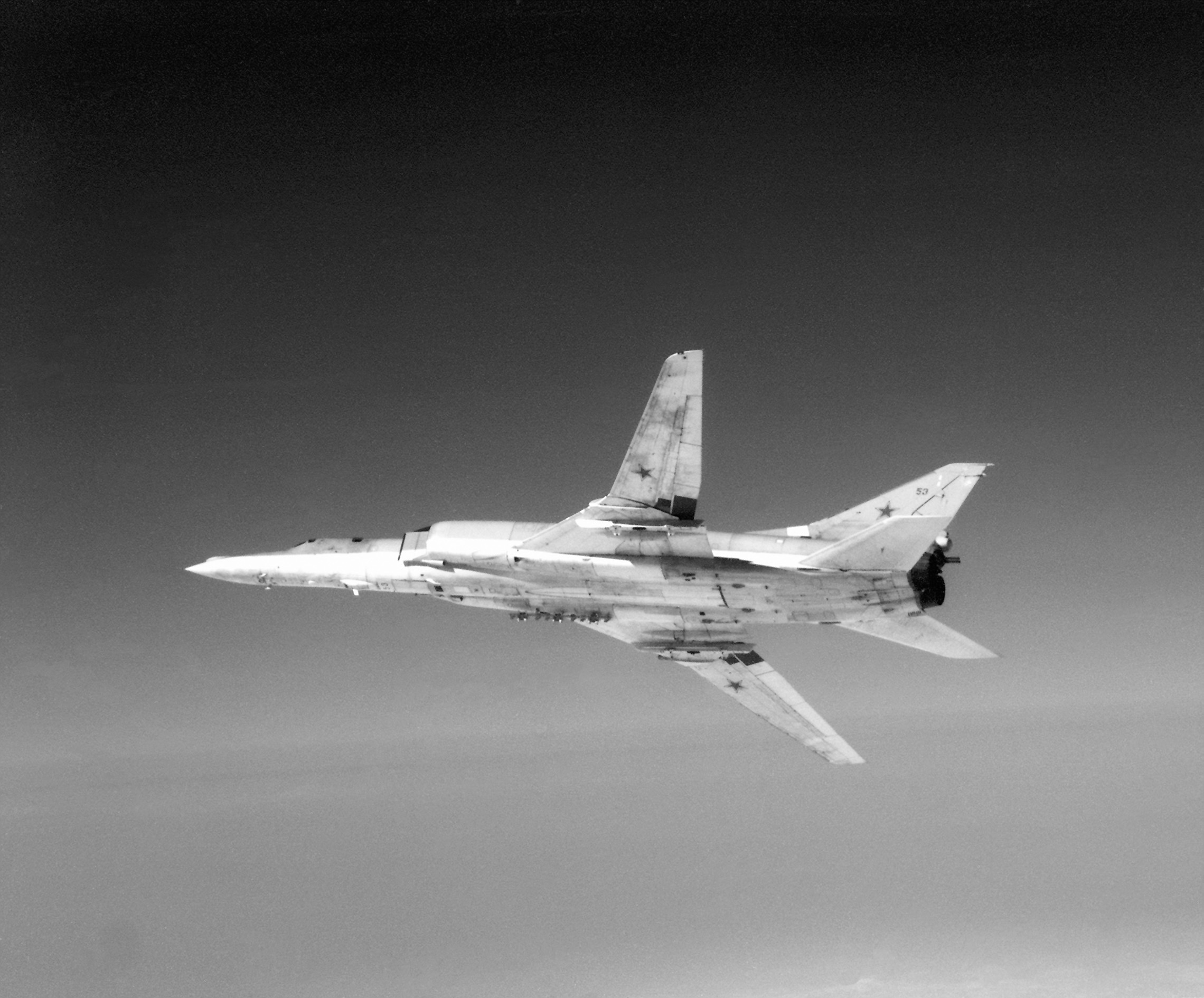
Soviet Tu-22M1 Backfire-B bomber aircraft in flight

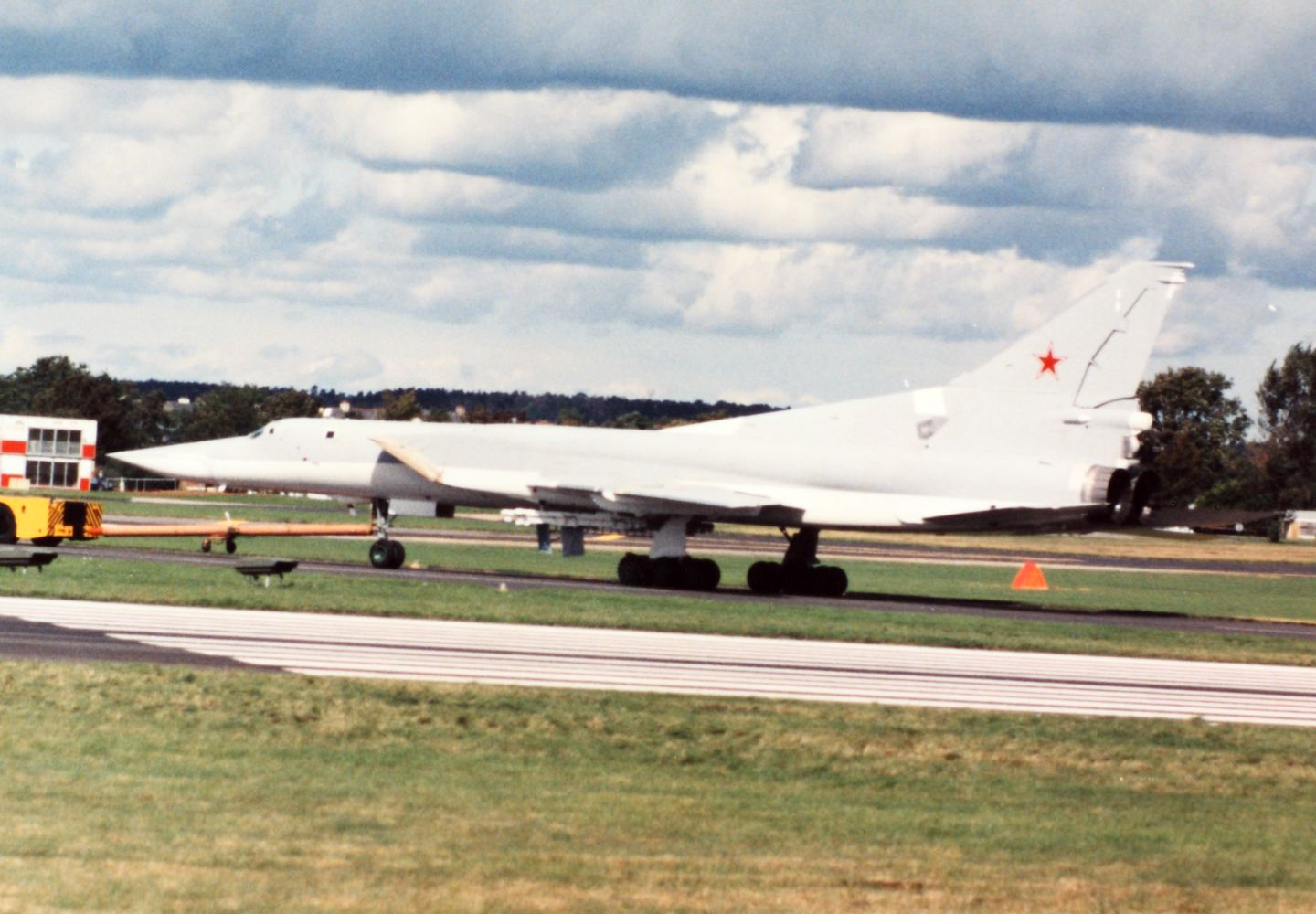
Soviet Tupolev Tu-22M-3 'Backfire C', 1992

Russia

- Russian Naval Aviation – Tu-22M3s of the Northern Fleet and Pacific Fleet were transferred to the Russian Air Force in 2011.
  - Northern Fleet
    - 924th Maritime Reconnaissance Aviation Regiment – Olenya (air base), Murmansk Oblast (now 40th Mixed Aviation Regiment of Russian Long Range Aviation
  - Pacific Fleet
    - 568th Composite Aviation Regiment – Kamenny Ruchey, Khabarovsk Krai

Soviet Union

- Soviet Air Forces – aircraft were transferred to Russian and Ukrainian Air Forces after the dissolution of the Soviet Union.
  - 22nd Guards Heavy Bomber Aviation Division
    - 200th Heavy Bomber Aviation Regiment – Babruysk, Mogilev Region, Byelorussian SSR
    - 260th Heavy Bomber Aviation Regiment – Stryi Air Base, Lviv Oblast, Ukrainian SSR
  - 326th Heavy Bomber Aviation Division
    - 132nd Heavy Bomber Aviation Regiment – Raadi Airfield, Estonian SSR
    - 402nd Heavy Bomber Aviation Regiment – Balbasovo Air Base, Vitebsk Region, Byelorussian SSR
    - 840th Heavy Bomber Aviation Regiment – Soltsy-2 (air base), Novgorod Oblast, Russian SFSR
  - 13th Guards Heavy Bomber Aviation Division
    - 184th Guards Heavy Bomber Aviation Regiment – Pryluky Air Base, Chernihiv Oblast, Ukrainian SSR
    - 185th Guards Heavy Bomber Aviation Regiment – Poltava Air Base, Poltava Oblast, Ukrainian SSR
    - 52nd Guards Heavy Bomber Aviation Regiment – Shaykovka (air base), Kaluga Oblast, Russian SFSR
- Soviet Naval Aviation
  - 5th Maritime Missile Aviation Division
    - 574th Maritime Missile Aviation Regiment – Lakhta air base, Arkhangelsk Oblast, Russian SFSR
    - 924th Guards Maritime Missile Aviation Regiment – Olenya (air base), Murmansk Oblast, Russian SFSR
  - 2nd Guards Maritime Missile Aviation Division
    - 5th Guards Maritime Missile Aviation Regiment – Veseloye, Crimean Oblast, Ukrainian SSR
    - 943rd Maritime Missile Aviation Regiment – Oktiabrske, Crimean Oblast, Ukrainian SSR
  - 33rd Center for Combat Employment and Retraining of Personnel Aviation VMF – Kulbakino Air Base, Mykolaiv, Ukrainian SSR
    - 540th Instructor-Research Maritime Missile Aviation Regiment

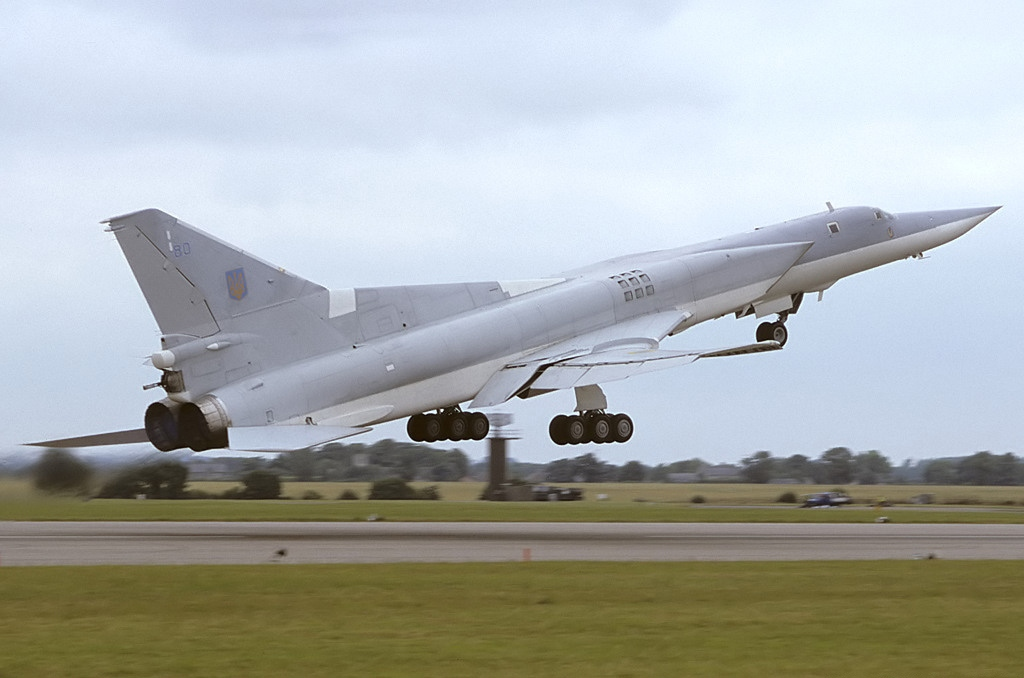
A Ukrainian Tupolev Tu-22M3 in 2000

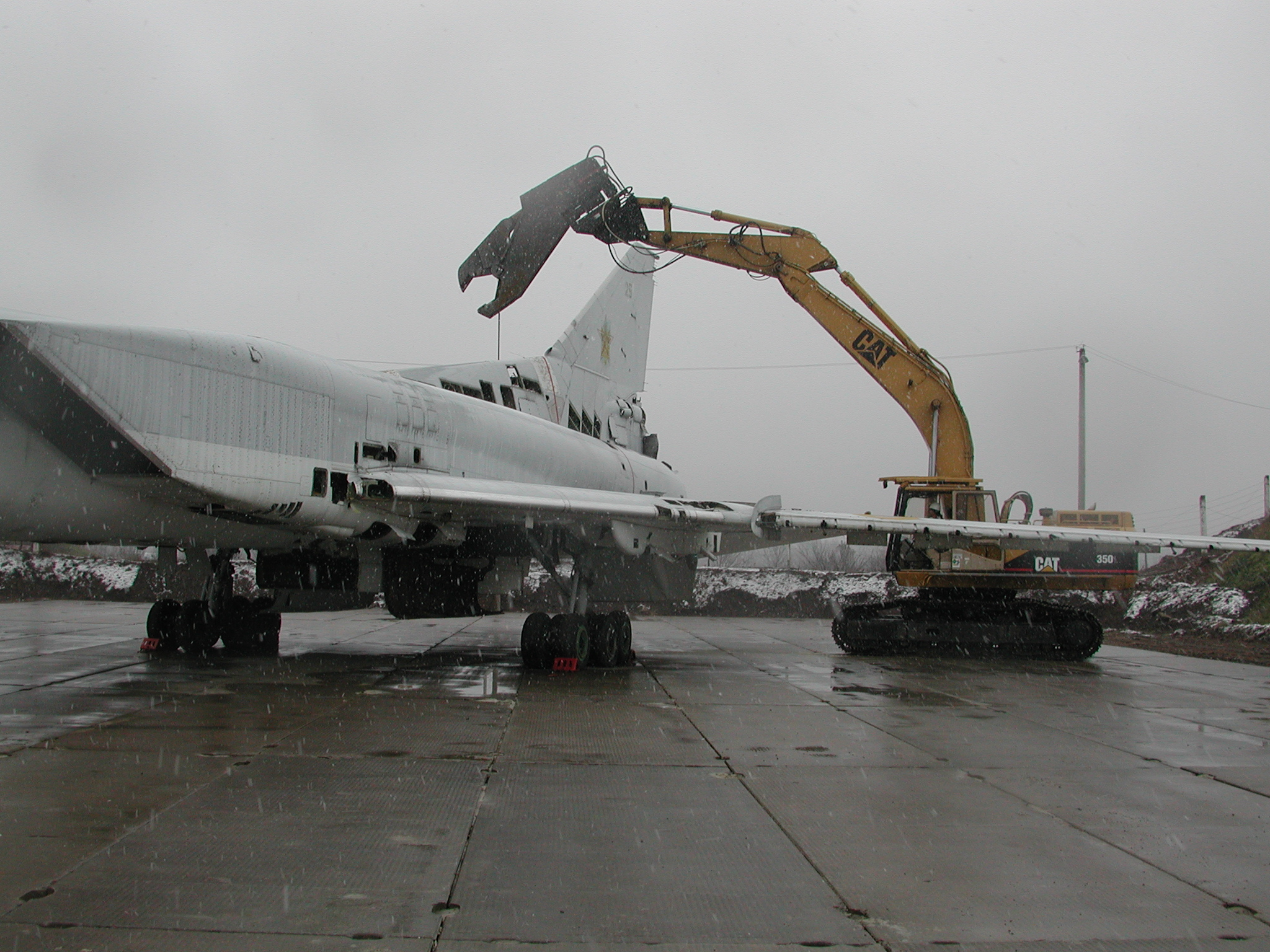
A Ukrainian Tu-22M3 is dismantled in 2002 with assistance from the Cooperative Threat Reduction Program implemented by the Defense Threat Reduction Agency.

Ukraine

- Ukrainian Air Force and Navy inherited a large number of Tu-22M2/M3 bombers. 60 Tu-22Ms (17 Tu-22M2 and 43 Tu-22M3) and 423 Kh-22 cruise missiles were scrapped under the Nunn–Lugar Cooperative Threat Reduction agreement led by the US. The last bombers were scrapped in January 2006.
  - 13th Guards Heavy Bomber Aviation Division – Poltava Air Base, Poltava Oblast
    - 185th Guards Heavy Bomber Aviation Regiment
  - 22nd Guards Heavy Bomber Aviation Division – Stryi Air Base, Lviv Oblast
    - 260th Heavy Bomber Aviation Regiment
- Ukrainian Naval Aviation
  - 2nd Guards Maritime Missile Aviation Division
    - 5th Guards Maritime Missile Aviation Regiment – Veseloye, Crimea
    - 943rd Maritime Missile Aviation Regiment – Oktiabrske, Crimea
  - 33rd Center for Combat Employment and Retraining of Personnel Aviation VMF – Kulbakino Air Base, Mykolaiv
    - 540th Instructor-Research Maritime Missile Aviation Regiment
- 1 Tu-22M3 in the Poltava Museum of Long-Range and Strategic Aviation
- 1 Tu-22M0, 1 Tu-22M2 and 1 Tu-22M3 in the Ukraine State Aviation Museum

== Notable accidents and losses ==
- 8 July 2004 (Soltsy Air Base): A Russian Air Force Tu-22M3 experienced a total electrical failure during a nighttime landing sequence, crashing just short of the runway. All four crew members were killed, triggering a temporary grounding of Russia's entire Backfire fleet.
- 9 August 2008 (Russo-Georgian War): A reconnaissance variant (Tu-22MR) was shot down by a Georgian Buk-M1 surface-to-air missile system. Three crew members died and one was captured.
- On 16 September 2017, a Tu-22M3 overran the runway at Shaykovka Air Base due to an aborted take off. The aircraft was written off. All four crew members survived without injury.
- On 22 January 2019, a Tu-22M3 crash-landed after a training flight while attempting to make a landing at the Olenya Air Base near the city of Olenegorsk in Russia's Murmansk region. Three of the four crew members died in the crash. A video shows the aircraft making a hard landing, which instantly ruptured the airframe and detached the forward cockpit area.
- On 23 March 2021, a Tu-22M3's ejection system malfunctioned, suddenly activating while still on the ground. The incident resulted in the deaths of three crew members and the hospitalization of a fourth. An official from Russia's Defense Ministry said that "due to the insufficient altitude for parachute opening, three crew members received fatal injuries upon landing". The aircraft was at Shaykovka Air Base undergoing engine start procedures.
- On 19 August 2023, a Tu-22M3 was destroyed by a drone strike from the 2023 Ukrainian counteroffensive while on the ground at Soltsy-2 in Novgorod Oblast. Satellite pictures of the air base showed that the other bombers stationed there had been evacuated, while photographs taken on the ground showed the plane that had been hit by the drone ablaze and was completely destroyed by the resultant fire.
- On 19 April 2024, a Tu-22M3 crashed in the Stavropol region of Russia. Video shows the aircraft in a flat spin with visible flames on the rear of the aircraft. Ukrainian sources claimed that the bomber was shot down using a surface-to-air missile, with the loss of the Tu-22M3 being the second confirmed kill of a strategic bomber during the conflict.
- On 15 August 2024, a Tu-22M3 crashed in the Irkutsk Oblast of Russia while performing a "routine flight". The preliminary cause of the crash is said to be a technical malfunction. According to the Ministry of Defense, the crew ejected before their plane crashed. Initially all crew were reported alive by Irkutsk Oblast Governor Igor Kobzev; however, he later clarified that a pilot had died. The other crew members were in hospital with "injuries of varying severity".
- On 2 April 2025, a Tu-22M3 crashed in Irkutsk Oblast, killing the pilot.
- On 15 June 2026, a Tu-22M3 crashed in Irkutsk Oblast during a training flight. Russian authorities reported that all members of the crew ejected safely.

== Specifications (Tu-22M3) ==
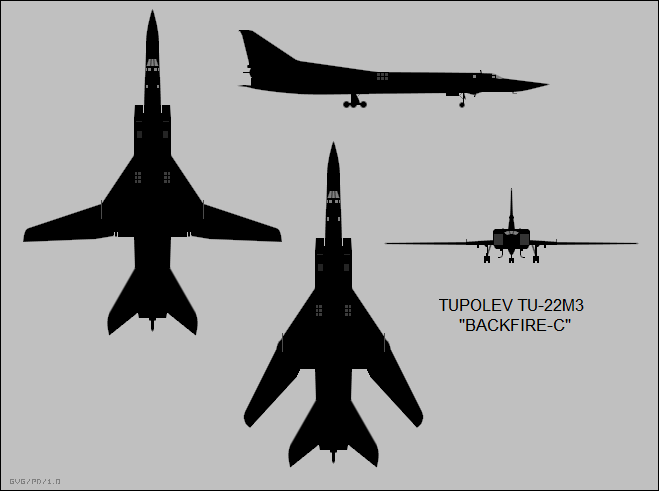
Orthographic projection of the Tupolev Tu-22M

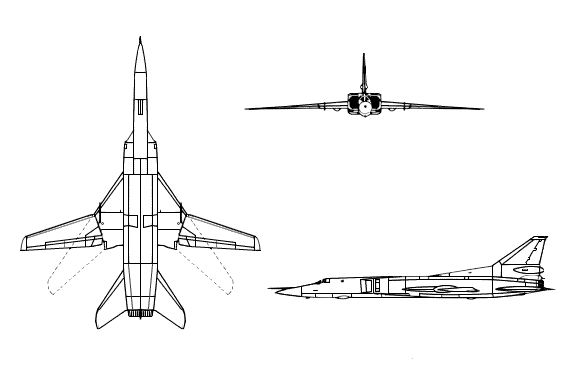
Tupolev Tu-26 Backfire

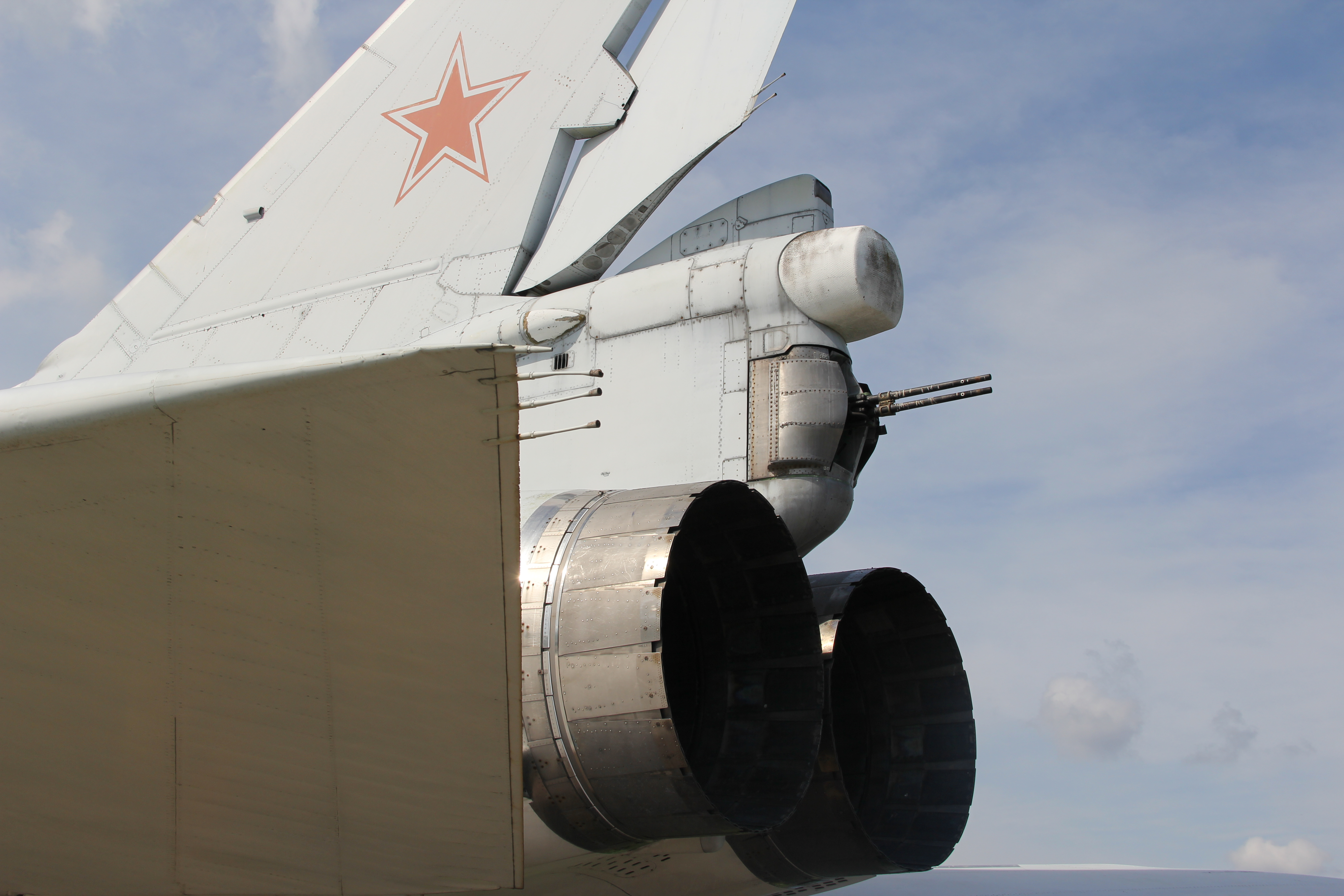
1 × 23 mm GSh-23 cannon in remotely controlled tail turret

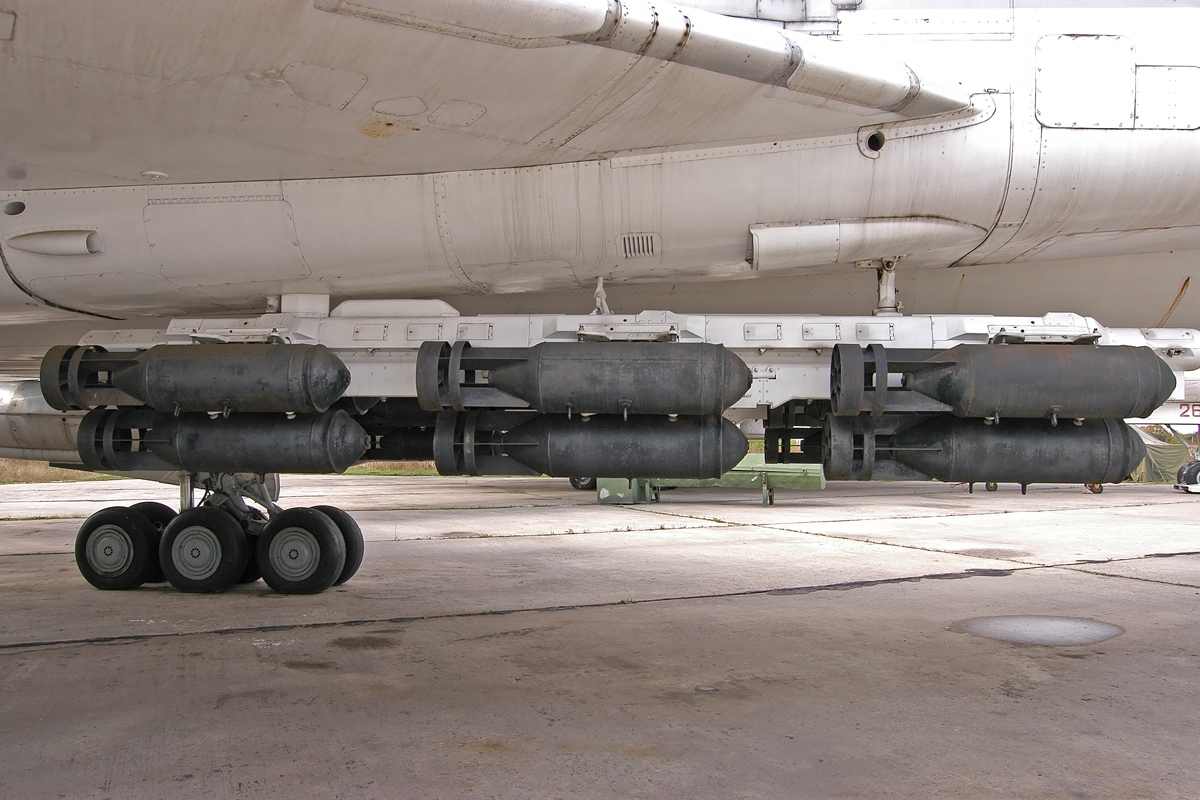
18 × FAB-500 general-purpose bomb on two fuselage mounted pylons

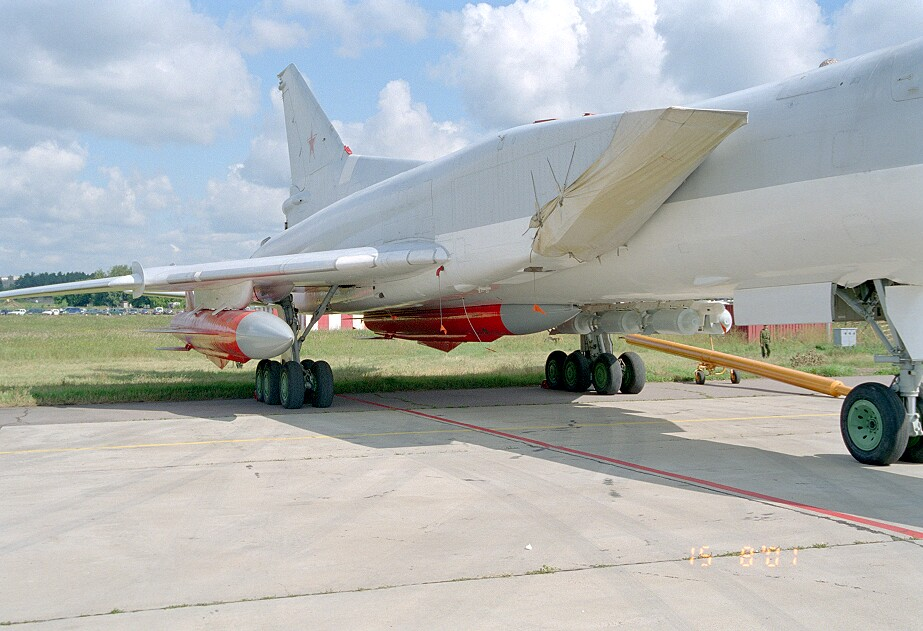
A Raduga Kh-32 anti-ship missile under a Tu-22M3

Data from Frawley,

General characteristics

- Crew: 4 (pilot, co-pilot, navigator, weapon systems officer)
- Length: 42.46 m (139 ft 4 in)
- Wingspan: 34.28 m (112 ft 6 in) spread (20° sweep)

23.3 m (76 ft) swept (65° sweep)

- Height: 11.05 m (36 ft 3 in)
- Wing area: 183.6 m^{2} (1,976 sq ft) spread (20° sweep)

175.8 m^{2} (1,892 sq ft) swept (65° sweep)

- Empty weight: 58,000 kg (127,868 lb)
- Gross weight: 112,000 kg (246,918 lb)
- Max takeoff weight: 126,000 kg (277,782 lb)
- Maximum take-off weight, rocket assisted: 126,400 kg (278,664 lb)
- Fuel capacity: 54,000 kg (119,050 lb) internal
- Powerplant: 2 × Kuznetsov NK-25 Afterburning turbofan engines, 247.9 kN (55,700 lbf) with afterburner

Performance

- Maximum speed: 1,997 km/h (1,241 mph, 1,078 kn) at 9,140 m (30,000 ft)
- Maximum speed: Mach 1.88
- Range: 6,800 km (4,200 mi, 3,700 nmi)
- Combat range: 2,500 km (1,600 mi, 1,300 nmi) with typical 10,000 kg weapons load
- Ferry range: 7,000 km (4,300 mi, 3,800 nmi)
- Service ceiling: 13,300 m (43,600 ft)
- Rate of climb: 15 m/s (3,000 ft/min)
- Wing loading: 688 kg/m^{2} (141 lb/sq ft)
- Thrust/weight: 0.45

Armament

- Guns: 1 × 23-mm GSh-23 cannon in remotely controlled tail turret
- Hardpoints: wing and fuselage pylons and internal weapons bay with a capacity of 24,000 kg (53,000 lb) of

- Up to 18 × FAB-500 general-purpose bomb in weapons bay and on wing pylons or
- Up to 3 × Kh-22/Kh-32 missiles in weapons bay and on wing pylons or
- Up to 6 × Kh-15 missiles on a MKU-6-1 rotary launcher in its bomb bay, plus 4 × Raduga Kh-15 missiles on two underwing pylons for a total of 10 missiles per aircraft.
- Up to 4 × Kh-47M2 Kinzhal
- Various sea mines and freefall bombs – 69 × FAB-250 or 8 × FAB-1500 might be typical.

The Kh-55 (AS-15 Kent) long-range cruise missile was tested on the Tu-22M but apparently not used in service.

== See also ==
Related development

- Tupolev Tu-98
- Tupolev Tu-160

Aircraft of comparable role, configuration, and era

- Rockwell B-1 Lancer
