= Lakhta air base =

Naval air base in Arkhangelsk Oblast, Russia

Lakhta Katunino
- Novodvinsk, Arkhangelsk Oblast in Russia
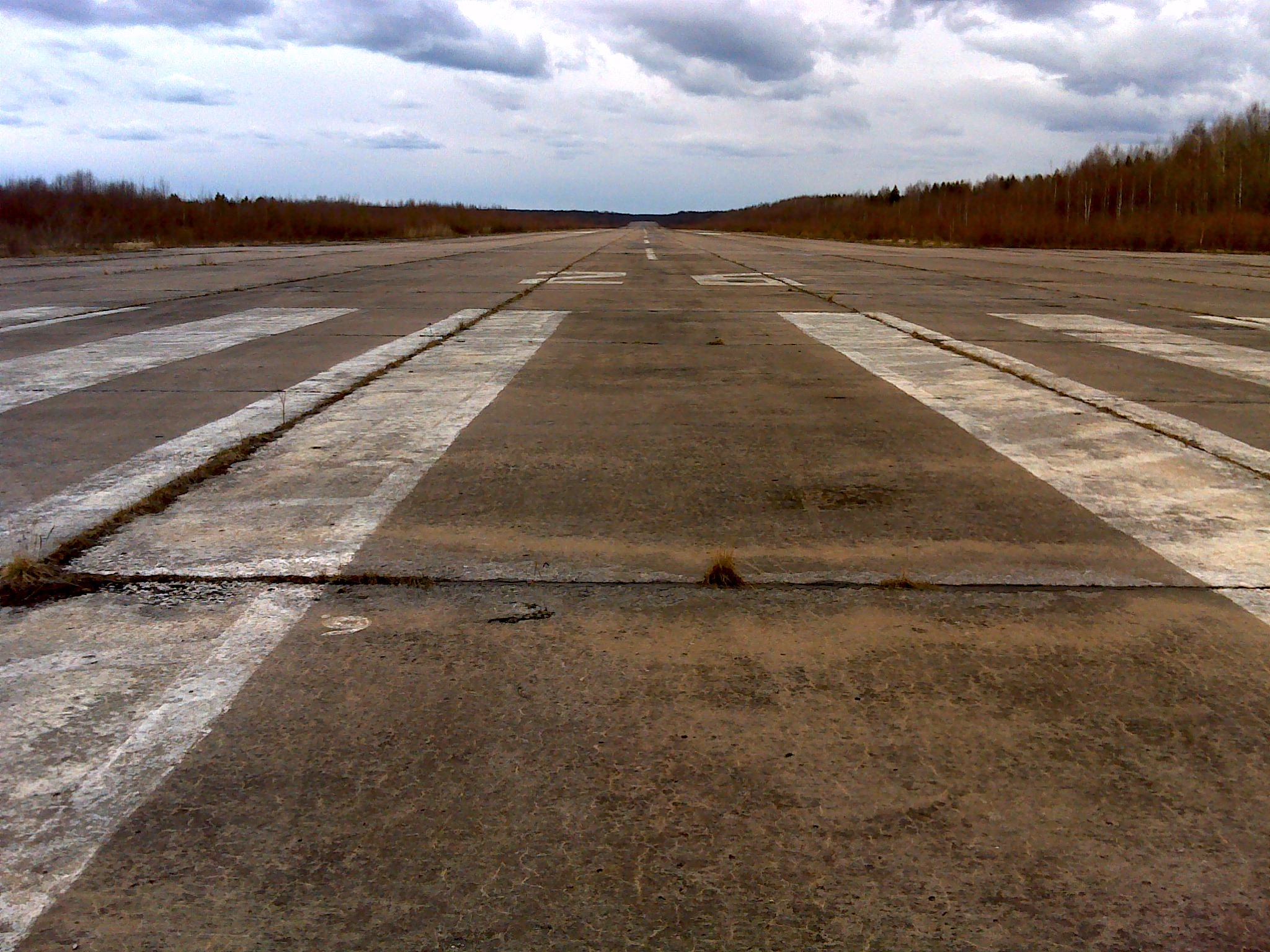

Site information
- Type: Air Base
- Owner: Ministry of Defence
- Operator: Russian Navy - Russian Naval Aviation

Location
- Shown within Arkhangelsk Oblast Lakhta (Russia)
- Coordinates: 64°23′0″N 40°43′0″E

Site history
- Built: 1956
- In use: 1956 - 2002

Airfield information
- Elevation: 31 metres (102 ft) AMSL
Runways
Direction	Length and surface
08/26	2,900 metres (9,514 ft) Concrete

Lakhta (also described as Kholm, Katunino, Novodvinsk, Lahta, or Pervomaysk) is a naval air base in Arkhangelsk Oblast, Russia located 22 km southeast of Arkhangelsk. It was home to 574 MRAP (574th Maritime Missile Aviation Regiment) flying Tupolev Tu-16 and Tupolev Tu-22M3 bombers. It is capable of nuclear weapons storage.

On February 21, 2002, a Russian Navy An-26 crashed after striking treetops while on final approach to Lakhta, killing 17 of the 20 people on board.

By 2006 Google Earth showed only two Tu-22M bombers, which were removed shortly afterward. Panoramio photos taken in 2010 show an auto rally on the old runway and extensive overgrowth, indicating the facility was abandoned in the mid or late 2000s.
