= Oleh Babiy =

Ukrainian military officer (1990–2023)

- Олег Іванович Бабій
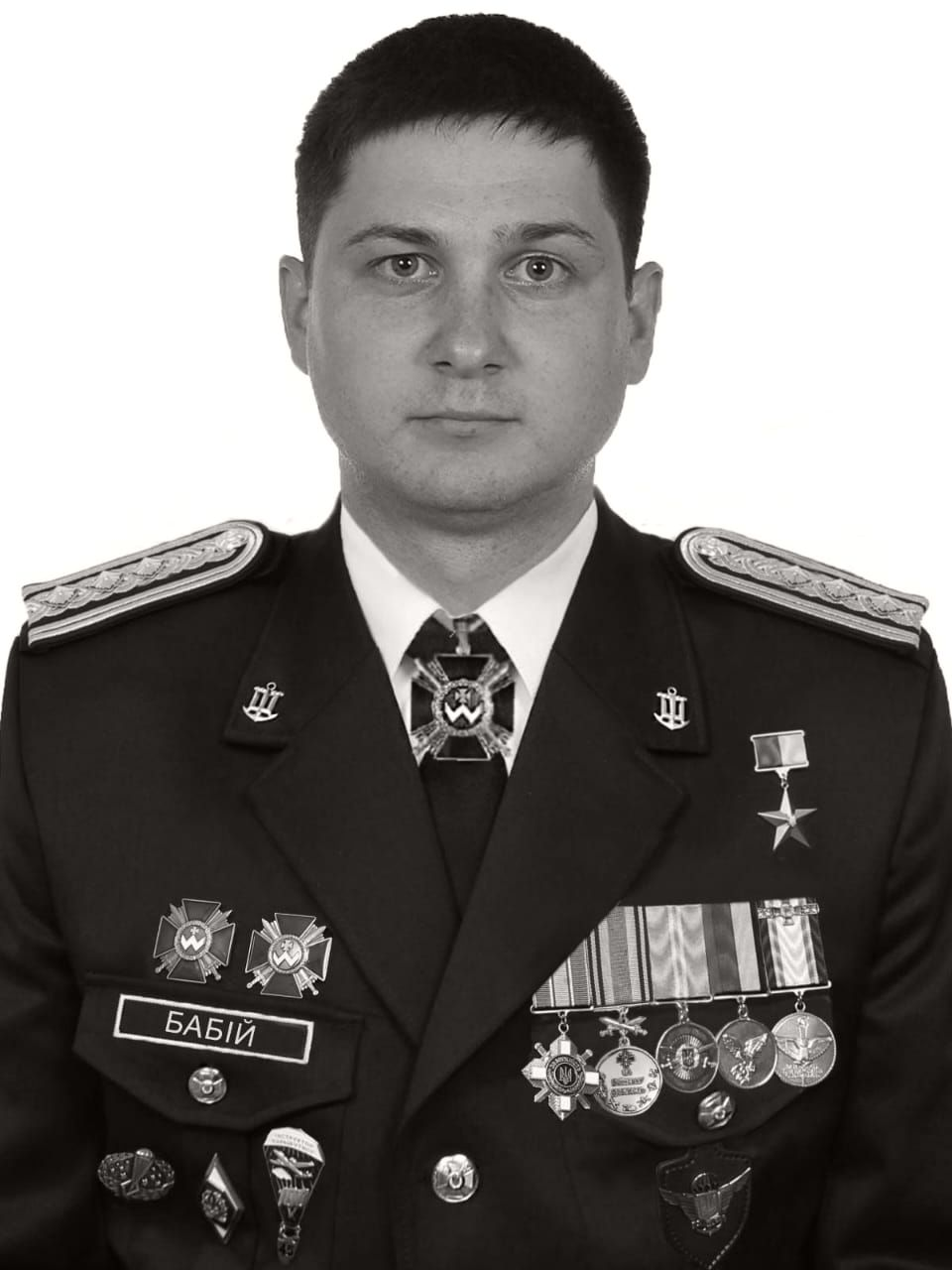
- Born: Oleh Ivanovych Babiy; 22 October 1990; Milovice, Czechoslovakia
- Died: 30 August 2023 (aged 32); Russia
- Alma mater: Hetman Petro Sahaidachnyi Ground Forces Academy
- Children: 2 daughters
- Military career
- Allegiance: Ukraine
- Branch: Main Directorate of Intelligence, MoD
- Rank: Colonel
- Commands: Main Directorate of Intelligence; National Guard of Ukraine
- Conflict: Russo-Ukrainian War; War in Donbas; Battle of Svitlodarsk; Russian invasion of Ukraine
- Awards: Order of Bohdan Khmelnytsky (3rd, 2nd, 1st classes); Hero of Ukraine (Order of the Gold Star)
- Memorials: Oleh Babiy Sq., Lviv, district of Sykhiv

Oleh Ivanovych Babiy (Ukrainian: Олег Іванович Бабій; 22 October 1990 – 30 August 2023) was a Ukrainian military officer, colonel of the Main Directorate of Intelligence of Ukraine, and a participant in the military defence of Ukraine after the Russo-Ukrainian War. He was posthumously conferred the title of Hero of Ukraine with the Order of the Gold Star.

== Biography ==
Babiy was born on 22 October 1990 in Milovice, Czechoslovakia. In 2011, he graduated from the Hetman Petro Sahaidachnyi Ground Forces Academy.

He had been participating in the Russo-Ukrainian War since 2014. From the first days of the full-scale Russian invasion of Ukraine in 2022, he organised and carried out special operations in the Russian-occupied territories of Ukraine and in Russia, for which he was repeatedly awarded.

As of February 2017, he held the position of commander of a patrol platoon with the vehicles of the 1st Patrol Battalion, 45th Operational Purpose Regiment of the National Guard of Ukraine.

With the beginning of the full-scale Russian invasion, he continued to perform combat missions, with nine successful reconnaissance missions behind enemy lines, twelve special events to organise and support the resistance movement in the temporarily occupied territories of Ukraine and behind enemy lines. Thanks to the successful completion of the missions, Colonel Babiy's group managed to disorganise the logistics of the occupation forces, destroy its important facilities and elements of critical infrastructure.

Babiy's last operation was the destruction of a Russian Tupolev Tu-22M3 bomber, and the disabling of two more, which, according to Ukraine, "completely destabilised the operation of airfields and long-range aviation bases" and reduced Russia's ability to launch missile strikes with Kh-22 missiles against Ukraine. In the course of the task, on 30 August 2023, the intelligence group headed by Babiy engaged in a battle with Russian special agents of the Federal Security Service. While covering the retreat of his comrades, Babiy was mortally wounded. For his heroic deeds, he was awarded the title of Hero of Ukraine with the posthumous award of the Order of the Golden Star.

Babiy is survived by his wife and two small children. Their youngest daughter was only one year old at the time of her father's death.

== Awards and decorations ==
On 15 July 2014, by the Decree of the President of Ukraine No. 593/2014, he was awarded the Order of Bohdan Khmelnytsky, 3rd class, for personal courage and heroism in the defence of state sovereignty and territorial integrity of Ukraine, loyalty to the military oath during the Russian armed aggression against Ukraine.

- Order of Bohdan Khmelnytsky 3rd, 2nd, 1st classes;
- Order for Courage, 3rd class;
- Commemorative sign "For Military Valor";
- Commemorative sign "For Courage in the Performance of Special Tasks";
- Badge "Participant of the Anti-Terrorist Operation";
- Medal "For Participation in the 'Svitlodarsk Arc' Battles";
- The title of Hero of Ukraine with the posthumous award of the Order of the Golden Star.

== Legacy ==
On 22 January 2024, on the Day of Unity of Ukraine, a memorial plaque in his honour was unveiled on the facade of School No. 49 in Lviv, where Oleh Babiy studied.

On 4 July 2024, the Lviv City Council adopted a decision to name a garden square in the Lviv district of Sykhiv after Oleh Babiy.
