= Sukhoi Su-17 =

Soviet variable-sweep wing fighter-bomber

Su-17/-20/-22
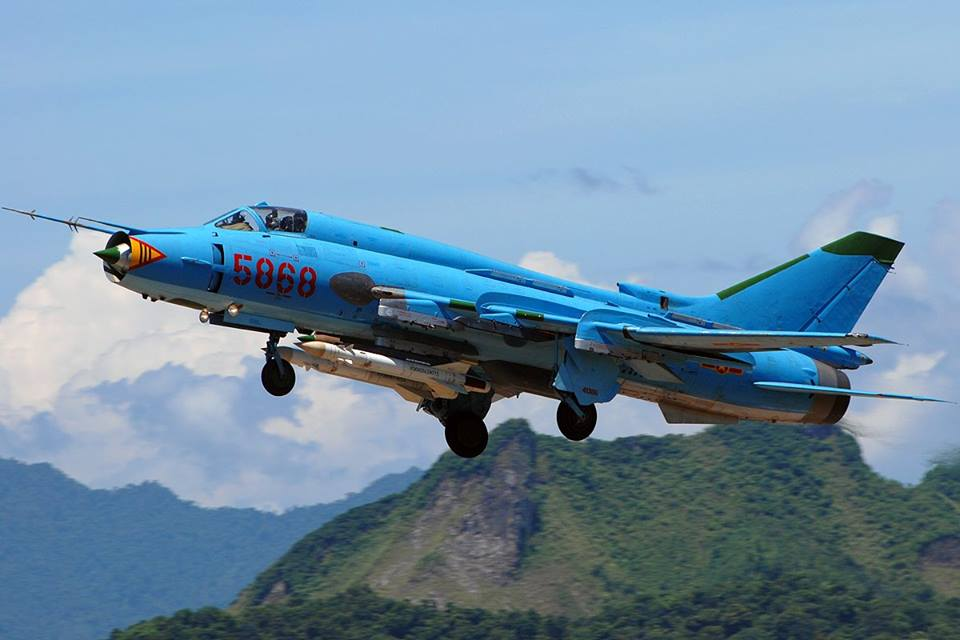
- Su-22M4 of the Vietnam People's Air Force with a pair of Kh-25 missiles

General information
- Type: Fighter-bomber
- National origin: Soviet Union
- Manufacturer: Sukhoi
- Status: In limited service
- Primary users: Soviet Air Forces (historical) Syrian Air Force (historical); Polish Air Force (historical); Vietnam People's Air Force; Islamic Revolutionary Guard Corps
- Number built: 2,867

History
- Manufactured: 1969–1990
- Introduction date: 1970
- First flight: 2 August 1966
- Developed from: Sukhoi Su-7

The Sukhoi Su-17 (Russian: Су-17; NATO reporting name: Fitter) is a variable-sweep wing fighter-bomber developed for the Soviet military. Developed from the Sukhoi Su-7, the Su-17 was the first variable-sweep wing aircraft to enter Soviet service and featured updated avionics. The aircraft also has variants which were designed for export such as the Sukhoi Su-22 and the less popular Su-20.

It was produced from 1967 to 1990. The Su-17/20/22 series had a long career and has been operated by many air forces, including those of the Soviet Union and other members of the Warsaw Pact, countries in the Arab world, Angola and Peru.

Although the Su-17 was capable of carrying nuclear weapons, its actual service was in conventional air-to-ground roles.

== Development ==
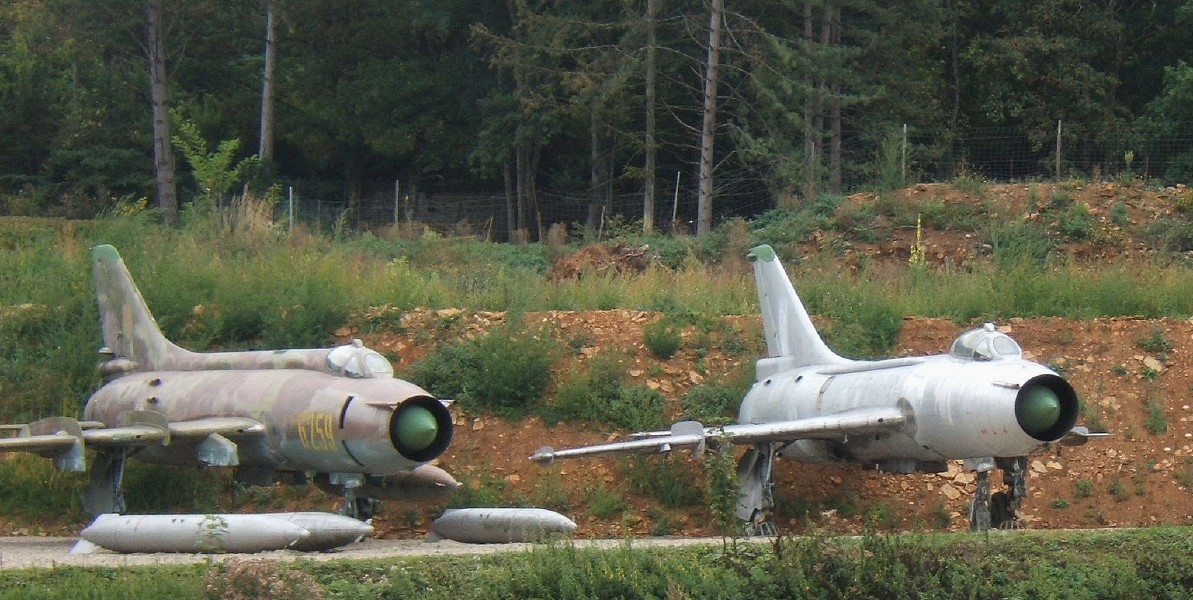
A Su-20 (left) next to an older, similar Su-7BKL.

Shortly after the Su-7 fighter-bomber was put into service, the Sukhoi Design Bureau was ordered to develop a modernisation program. The program would be aimed primarily at updating on-board avionics and takeoff/landing characteristics. The concept of variable-geometry wings, something gaining wider attention at that time, was adopted. The program was to be led by Sukhoi's head designer, Nikolay Zyrin.

In 1963, the Sukhoi OKB with input from TsAGI created a variable-sweep wing technology demonstrator. The S-22I (also known as the Su-7IG, NATO designation "Fitter-B"), converted from a production Su-7BM, had fixed inner portions of the wing with movable outer segments that could be swept to 28°, 45°, or 62°. The S-22I first took off (with Vladimir Ilyushin at the controls) on 2 August 1966. It was later demonstrated at the air parade in Domodedovo in July 1967.

Flight testing revealed that the configuration improved both take-off/landing characteristics, range and endurance. Handling was generally better than the fixed wing Su-7, with the exception that buffeting at high angles of attack to warn of imminent stall no longer occurred.

The aircraft was sent into serial production in 1969 by a joint resolution of the Central Committee of the Communist Party of the Soviet Union and the Council of Ministers. The design of the Su-7IG was modified further, eventually with enough difference to justify the S-32 internal designation. The S-32 first took off on 1 July 1969, with Yevgeny Kukushev at the controls.

Serial production started at Yuri Gagarin Aviation Factory (now KnAAPO) in 1969. The 523rd Aviation Regiment, of the Far East Military Okrug, was the first to receive the Su-17. The Su-17 was produced until 1990, producing 2867 units.

The Su-17 resembles its predecessor, the Su-7, with weight-saving measures added at the cost of combat survivability, an example of which is the removal of pilot protection armor.

The prototype S-22I differed little from the Su-7 except for the wing, essentially a technology demonstrator for the variable-geometry wing. It was later lost in an accident.

Following the S-22I, two pre-production prototypes were constructed, designated S32-1 and the S32-2. The two aircraft mounted updated avionics, and replaced the older AP-28I-2 autopilot with the newer SAU-22 automatic control system.

The next series of prototypes were the Su-7-85, with 85 indicating the batch number. The batch of ten aircraft incorporated a redesigned fuselage, a streamlined cockpit (similar to the Su-7U), extra, more accessible maintenance hatches, and an upward-opening canopy. The front of the cockpit was protected with a windshield and two electrically heated side windows. The first three aircraft of the 86th batch incorporated clear windshields with warm air blown at them, taken from the 9th stage of the engine compressor. However, this windshield was dropped in favor of the more traditional glazed windshield following tests by the 4th Combat Use and Retraining of Air Force Personnel Center in Lipetsk.

The Su-7-85 was equipped with a modified KS4-S32 ejection seat, capable of safely ejecting the pilot at speeds above 140–170km/h (87-104 mph, 75-92 knots).

The fuel system was modified from the Su-7, as well; fuel was stored in three lightweight tanks, with provisions for up to four disposable auxiliary tanks each with 600 litres (158.5 US gallons, 131.98 imp gallons) of capacity (itself used on the Su-7B), or two PTB-1150 tanks with 1150 litres (304 US gallons, 253 imperial gallons) each, mounted on "wet" pylons under the fuselage.

The wing was largely unmodified from the S-22I. The stationary part of the wing was half as long as the rotating part. With wings at maximum sweep, the Su-17 would look virtually identical to the Su-7. A slide-out flap was installed on the stationary part of the wing, while a slat, a rotating flap and aileron were mounted on the rotating part. The sweep angle could be configured between 30° and 63°. The horizontal and vertical tails were swept at 55°.

Flight control was assisted by non-reversing hydraulic boosters, the BU-220DL2 and -220DP2 for the left and right ailerons, the BU-250L and -250P for the stabilizers and the BU-250DRP for the rudder. The flight control systems were spring-loaded to provide feedback on the stick and the rudder pedals.

Three independent hydraulic systems are installed on the Su-17—an actuating system and two booster systems, each with a hydraulic pump. The actuating hydraulic system was responsible for adjusting the sweep angle of the wing, deploying/retracting the landing gear, the flaps and slats, adjusting the intake ramps, the flight control mechanisms used by the SAU-22 autopilot, and the steering front wheel. The booster systems control the flight surfaces. The systems operate in parallel to ensure safe operation in the event of a failure. The remaining operational system would provide power to the flight surfaces, albeit at half the power. The Nr 1 booster system feeds the GM-40 hydraulic motor driving the rotary parts of the wing. All hydraulic systems are fed with the AMG-10 hydraulic fluid, with a standard operating pressure of 215 kgf/cm (3057.95 psi) for the booster systems and 210 (2986.83 psi) for the actuating system.

A pneumatic system with a 150kgf/cm (2133.45 psi) pressure operates the normal and emergency brakes on the landing gear as well as the emergency landing gear/flaps deployment system, and was responsible for charging the two NR-30 cannons mounted on the aircraft, pressurizing the cockpit, opening/closing the canopy and pressurizing the hydraulic fluid tanks.

The Su-17 was powered by a modified Lyulka AL-7F1-250 with a slightly uprated thrust of 9600 kgf (21,164 lbs) on afterburners. It was equipped with a compressor actuator with redundancy, and a system for intake adjustment. The aircraft would need to be disassembled into two halves to replace its engine. Jettisonable SPRD-110 RATO boosters are available to facilitate take-off on short runways, providing a momentary thrust of up to 3000 kgf (661 lbs) each.

On-board electronics are fed by a 28V DC circuit and a 115V, 400 Hz single-phase AC circuit, fed by two GS-12T DC generators, an SGO-8TF AC generator and a 20NKBN25 nickel–cadmium battery.

The Su-17 has the ability to carry free-fall nuclear bombs with a BDZ-56FNM bomb rack. A special code device would be installed in the cockpit, mandating a correct code input before the bomb could be armed and released, to prevent unauthorized uses of nuclear weaponry. The aircraft also has a toss bombing capability for nuclear weapon delivery, with which it could approach the target, initiate a steep climb and release the bomb when pointing almost upright, and then activate afterburners to escape the blast radius. A special IAB-500 bomb was designed specifically for practicing such a bombing technique.

== Operational history ==
=== Soviet Union/Russia ===
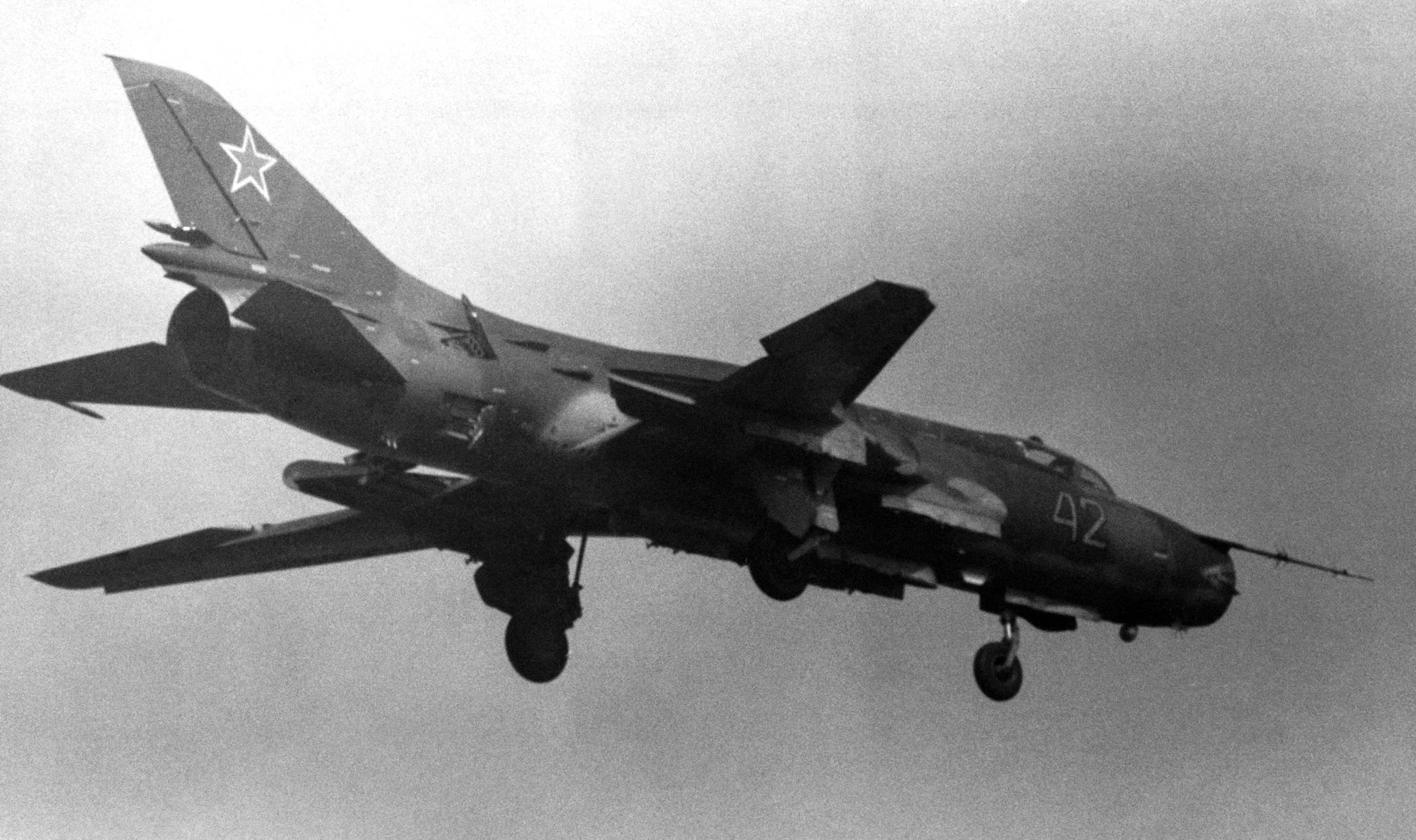
A Soviet Su-17M.

The Su-17 was used during the Soviet-Afghan war during Operation South and launched air strikes on a Mujahideen base at Robat Jaali near the Iranian Afghan border.

The Su-17M3/4 were used during the First Chechen War alongside Sukhoi Su-24s and Sukhoi Su-25s in ground attack and reconnaissance missions.

In a move to eliminate single-engine strike aircraft from its inventory, the Russian Air Force retired its last Su-17M4 along with its fleet of MiG-23/27s in 1998.

=== Angola ===
The Soviets supplied the communist government of Angola with 12 Su-20Ms in 1982 or 1983, which formed the basis of the 15th FS. The squadron suffered a swift loss of at least six aircraft – most in mishaps – by 1985, and three more by 1988, and had only two aircraft left when it was reinforced with batch of 14 Su-22M-4Ks and two Su-22UM-3Ks in 1989–90 (incorporated into the 26th Air Regiment, based in Moçâmedes).

=== Iran ===
All Iranian Su-22 aircraft were originally Iraqi ones, which had been used by Iraq before. On 3 March 2026 CENTCOM released a footage showing two Iranian Su-22s destroyed by United States on the ground on a military airfield during the 2026 Iran war.

=== Iraq ===
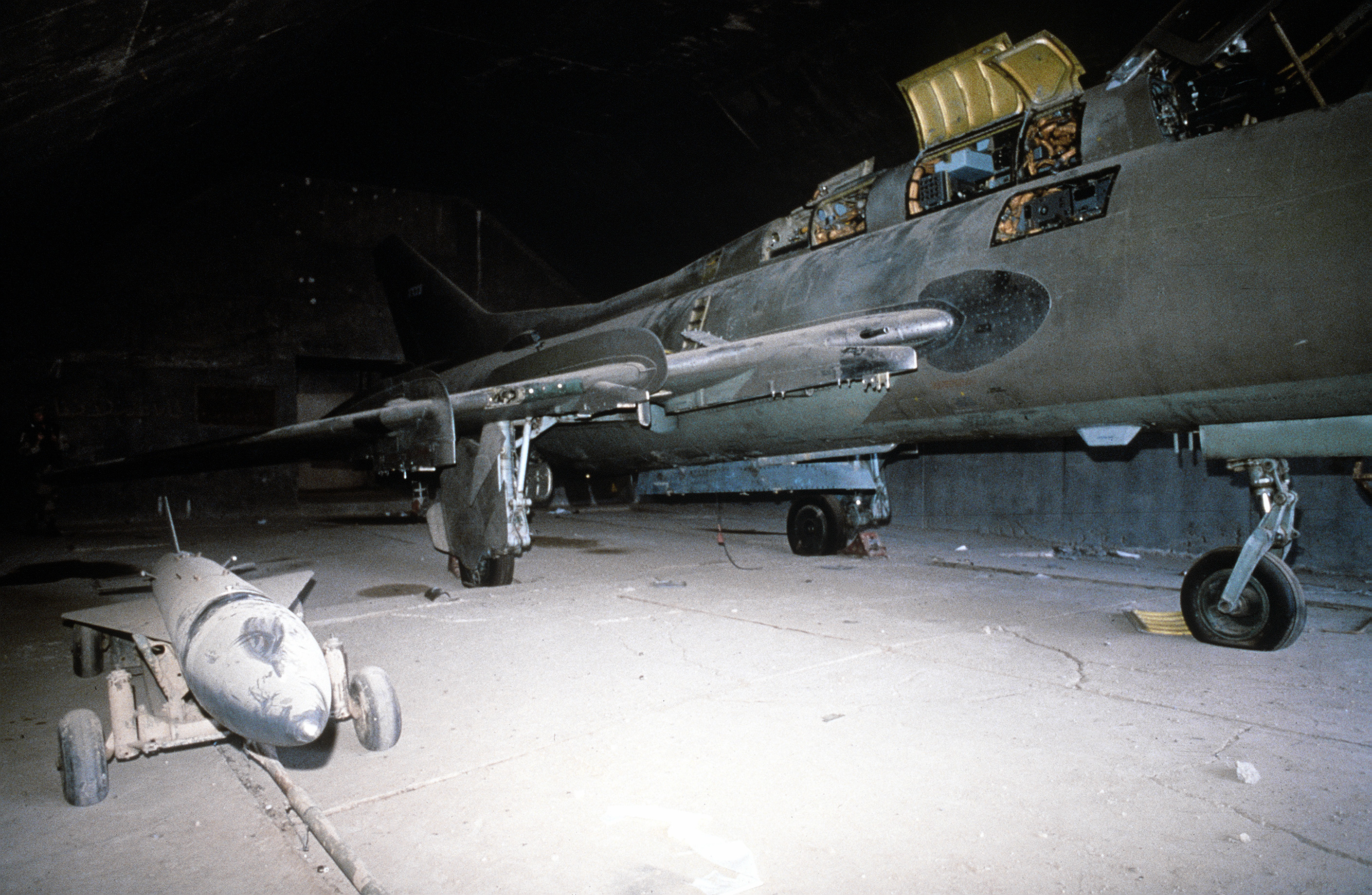
Iraqi Su-22M aircraft in a hangar damaged by Coalition air strikes during Operation Desert Storm.

From 22 September 1980 to 20 August 1988, during the Iran–Iraq War, Iraq used Su-17 export versions (Su-20 and Su-22) alongside older Su-7s. They were mostly used in ground-attack and close air support roles. Iranian Grumman F-14 Tomcats shot down 21 Su-20/-22s, that western sources have confirmed. Eighteen Su-20/-22s were also shot down by Iranian McDonnell Douglas F-4 Phantom IIs. and three by Iranian Northrop F-5s. In October 1980, an Iraqi Su-20 scored its sole kill of the war when an Su-20 of the 1st Fighter Squadron piloted by 1st Lt. Riadh Y. Yousef scored a gun kill with its 30 mm cannons on an F-4E, killing both crew (identified as Din-Mohammadi and Nouri-Bahadori).

Official Iraqi accounts show no loss of Su-20 aircraft throughout the war against the Kurds and Iran. Twenty Su-22M2s, two Su-22M3s and seven Su-22M4s were lost during the war with Iran, the majority to anti-aircraft fire sustained during low-level bombing raids against Iranian front lines.

In 1991, during the Gulf War, Iraqi Su-22s saw limited active service because the Iraqi regime distrusted the Iraqi Air Force (IQAF). On 7 February 1991, two Su-20/22s and one Su-7 were shot down by United States Air Force McDonnell Douglas F-15 Eagles using AIM-7 air-to-air missiles when the IQAF was moving its aircraft to Iran.

On 20 and 22 March 1991, two other Su-22s were downed by USAF F-15s in an attempt to protect Kurdish civilians before the start of Operation Provide Comfort to provide humanitarian aid and the establishment of a no-fly zone north of 36th parallel.

=== Libya ===
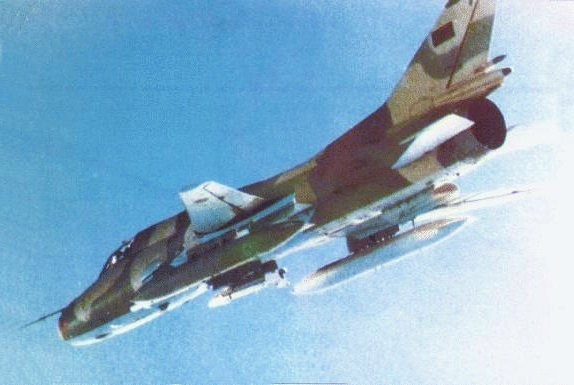
Libyan Su-22M.

Two Libyan Su-22s were shot down in the Gulf of Sidra incident by United States Navy Grumman F-14 Tomcats on 19 August 1981. One Su-22 launched a K-13 missile head-on at one of the F-14s from an estimated 300-meter (984-foot) closing distance, however the missile was evaded. Both were then downed by AIM-9 Sidewinder missiles.

On 8 October 1987, in the aftermath of the Chadian–Libyan conflict, an Su-22 was shot down by a FIM-92A Stinger launched by Chadian forces. The pilot, Capt. Diya al-Din, ejected and was captured. He was later granted political asylum by the French government. During the recovery operation, a Libyan Mikoyan-Gurevich MiG-23MS was shot down by a Stinger.

A Libyan Su-22 crashed near Benghazi on 23 February 2011. The crew members, Captain Attia Abdel Salem al Abdali and his copilot, Ali Omar Gaddafi, were ordered to bomb the city in response to the Libyan Civil War. They refused, bailing out of the aircraft. Su-22s were heavily used by Libyan loyalist forces against insurgent forces from mid-February to mid-March 2011, when the international mission started and the no fly zone was imposed. Among other missions, Su-22s attacked Anti-Gaddafi positions in Bin Jawad in early March 2011 as government forces retook the town.

One Libyan Air Force Su-22 was destroyed on the ground by a Belgian Air Force F-16AM on 27 March.

=== Peru ===
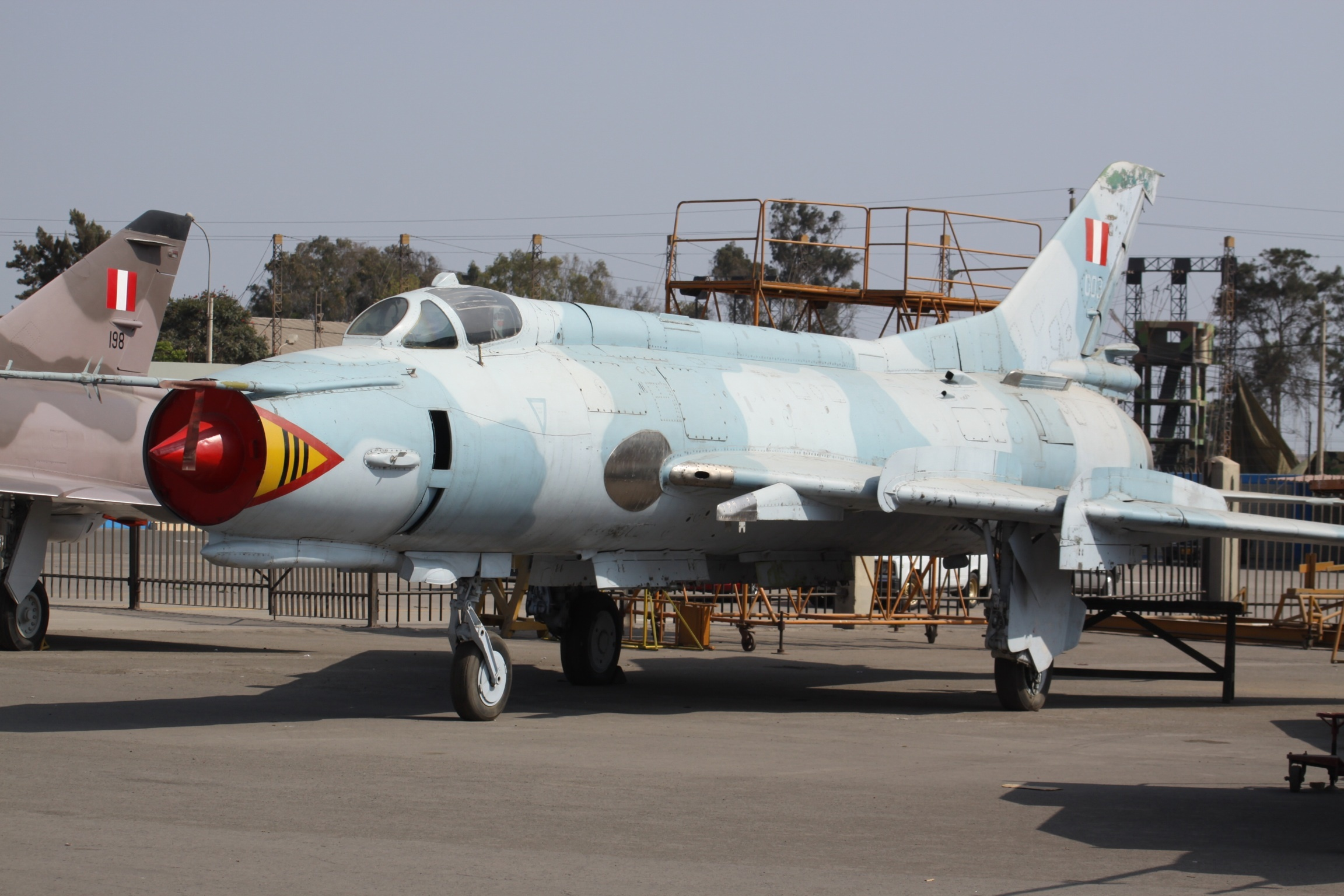
Peruvian Air Force Sukhoi Su-22

Peru was the only export customer of the type in the Americas.

On 11 April 1980, a Peruvian Su-22 responded to a UFO incident over the Arequipa region.

On 24 April 1992, in a context of diplomatic and political tensions between Peru and the US after the autocoup orchestrated by Peruvian President Alberto Fujimori 19 days before, Peruvian Su-22s attacked a Lockheed C-130H Hercules of the United States Air Force's 310th Airlift Squadron which was intercepted at sea, northwest of Lima, injuring six of the 14 crew members. Master Sergeant Joseph C. Beard Jr. was killed when he was sucked from the cabin at 18,500 feet, and crew member Ronald Hetzel sustained severe injuries.

The Hercules' pilot barely managed to land the crippled plane, with one engine damaged and three blown landing tires, at a Peruvian Air Force base near the city of Talara, where the crew was detained, and the bullet-ridden plane impounded, before being freed after US government pressure. The incident caused an almost year-long interruption to the US anti-drug Air Bridge Denial Program and the establishment of a Joint Air Operation Center at Howard Air Force Base in Panama, from where the C-130 had been operating.

During the brief 1995 Cenepa War between Peru and Ecuador, two Peruvian Sukhoi Su-22s were lost on 10 February when two Ecuadorian Air Force Mirage F1JAs, piloted by Maj. R. Banderas and Capt. C. Uzcátegui, were directed over five targets approaching the disputed Cenepa Valley. After making visual contact, the Mirages launched their missiles, however the Ecuadorian Air Force never showed the HUD videos of the fighters confirming the shootdowns, claiming two Peruvian Su-22As shot down, while a Kfir claimed a further Cessna A-37 Dragonfly. Peru, however, denied that the two Su-22As were shot down by Mirages, stating that one was struck by Ecuadorian anti-aircraft artillery during a low flying ground-attack mission and the second crashed because of an engine fire.

The Su-22s flew 45 sorties into the combat zone. A 20-strong force of Su-22s was established at El Pato as a retaliatory force should Ecuador decide to attack the coastal port.

=== Poland ===
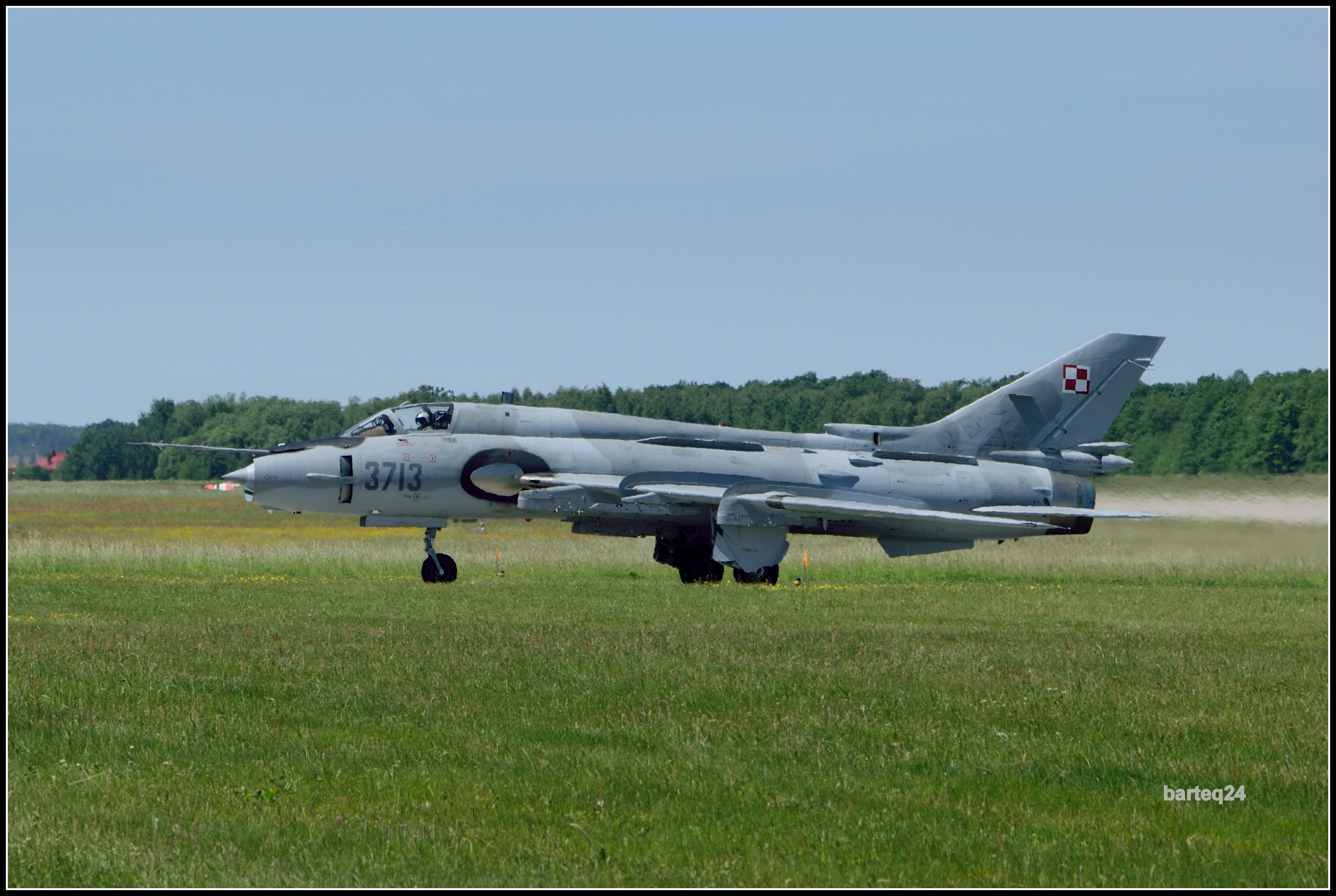
Polish Air Force Sukhoi Su-22M4

The Polish Air Force received their first Su-22M4 (3005) on 28 August 1984, with the Fitter being delivered to Piła Air Base. The Polish Air Force would go on to operate 90 Su-22M4s and 20 Su-22UM3Ks.

On 19 August 2003, a Polish Air Force Su-22M4K was accidentally shot down by friendly fire during an exercise by a Polish 2K12 Kub missile battery. The aircraft was flying 21 km from the coast over the Baltic Sea near Ustka. The pilot ejected and was rescued after two hours in the water. In 2012, Poland was investigating the replacement of its Su-22s with three squadrons of unmanned aerial vehicles.

As of 2014 the Polish Air Force was planning to retain the Su-22s in service. The decision was hoped to have a positive impact on Polish industry, as the WZL nr 2 repair facility in Bydgoszcz would maintain the remaining aircraft under contract to the Air Force. The decision would also allow the Air Force to retain the well-trained ground crews and pilots operating the aircraft. The Poles consider the Su-22 easier to maintain and repair than the other main combat aircraft types currently in Polish service (mainly the MiG-29 and the F-16). They suffer from fewer malfunctions and other problems (high, 70–75% non-error index). It is the only aircraft in Polish inventory equipped for electronic intelligence, warfare, and support of ground systems. The Polish Air Force retained a large stockpile of air-to-ground weapons for use with the Su-22. By some estimates, the cost of destroying these resources would be higher than the projected cost of continuing Su-22 operations.

It was decided that starting from 2015, only 12 Su-22M4s and 4-6 Su-22UM3Ks out of 32 remaining would undergo a refit, extending their lifespan by ten years. For economic reasons the aircraft are not modernized, apart from fitting an additional RS-6113-2 C2M radio with a blade antenna on the top, but they received a grey multishade camouflage, similar to other Polish aircraft.Several Polish Su-20s and Su-22s were donated to various museums, including the Polish Army Museum in Warsaw, the Armament Museum in Poznań, the Museum of Polish Arms in Kołobrzeg and the Polish Aviation Museum in Kraków. Other were placed on monuments or donated to schools as technical aids.

Following the acquisition of 48 KAI T-50 Golden Eagle aircraft from South Korea in 2022, the Su-22 fleet was to be retired. Polish Su-22s were retired in September 2025.

=== Syria ===
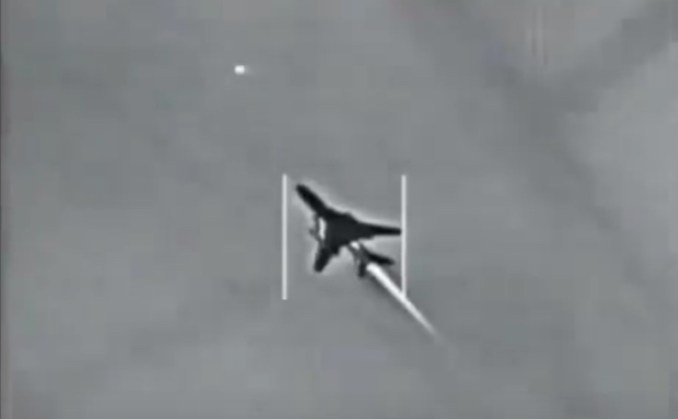
Syrian Su-22 locked by a U.S Navy F/A-18 Super Hornet before being shot down

The Syrian Air Force (SyAAF) used Su-20/-22s to attack Israeli forces in the Yom Kippur War and 1982 Lebanon War. Several Su-20/-22s were shot down by the Israeli Air Force.. From mid-2012, in the Syrian Civil War, Syrian Air Force Su-22s were involved in combat operations against Syrian insurgents.. Videos showed Su-22s using unguided munitions like other SyAAF fixed-wing aircraft; mostly general-purpose bombs, cluster bombs and incendiary bombs and unguided rockets. Attack tactics were low to medium-altitude flat bombing runs with pull up after rocketing or bombing, deploying decoy flares for self-defense. As of the end of 2015, the SyAAF Su-22s suffered fewer losses compared to the SyAAF MiG-21 and MiG-23. The first confirmed loss of an SyAAF Su-22 was recorded on 14 February 2013, when rebel forces shot it down using MANPAD. On 18 June 2017, a US F/A-18E Super Hornet engaged and shot down an SyAAF Su-22 for dropping munitions on US-backed forces. According to the wingman of the Super Hornet that made the kill, the Syrian pilot was able to eject and was later returned to the Syrian government. On 24 July 2018, an SyAAF Su-22 that entered Israeli airspace was shot down by two Israeli Patriot missiles. Other Syrian Su-22 jets were downed during the civil war.

=== Yemen ===
On 11 August 2009, Yemeni armed forces started Operation Scorched Earth in northern Yemen to fight Houthi rebels. The Yemeni Air Force backed the army with air raids on rebel positions. On 5 October 2009, a Yemeni Su-22 crashed, with the rebels claiming to have shot it down. Earlier on 2 October, the Yemeni revolutionaries said they shot down a "MiG-21" while the military insisted technical problems caused the crash. On 8 November, a third Yemeni fighter aircraft, reported to be a Sukhoi, was destroyed. Again the military alleged technical problems, while the Yemeni rebels claimed they shot it down. The pilot ejected and was recovered by friendly forces. The Yemeni Air force used Sukhoi aircraft during the Arab Spring uprising. On 28 September 2011, a Yemeni Air Force Su-22 was shot down by tribesmen opposed to the rule of President Saleh. The government confirmed that rebels were responsible for the shoot-down, and that the pilot had been captured. On February 19, 2013, a Yemeni Su-22 on a training mission crashed for unknown reasons into Sanaa, killing 12 civilians. On May 13, 2013, another Yemen Su-22 on a training mission crashed in Sanaa, killing the pilot.

=== Failed bids ===
==== India ====
India evaluated the Su-22 to replace the Su-7 and HAL HF-24 aircraft in late 1973, with a delegation under Air Marshal YV Malse evaluating the aircraft in August 1973. However, the aircraft was short of IAF expectations, and subsequently, India ordered the larger SEPECAT Jaguars.

== Variants ==
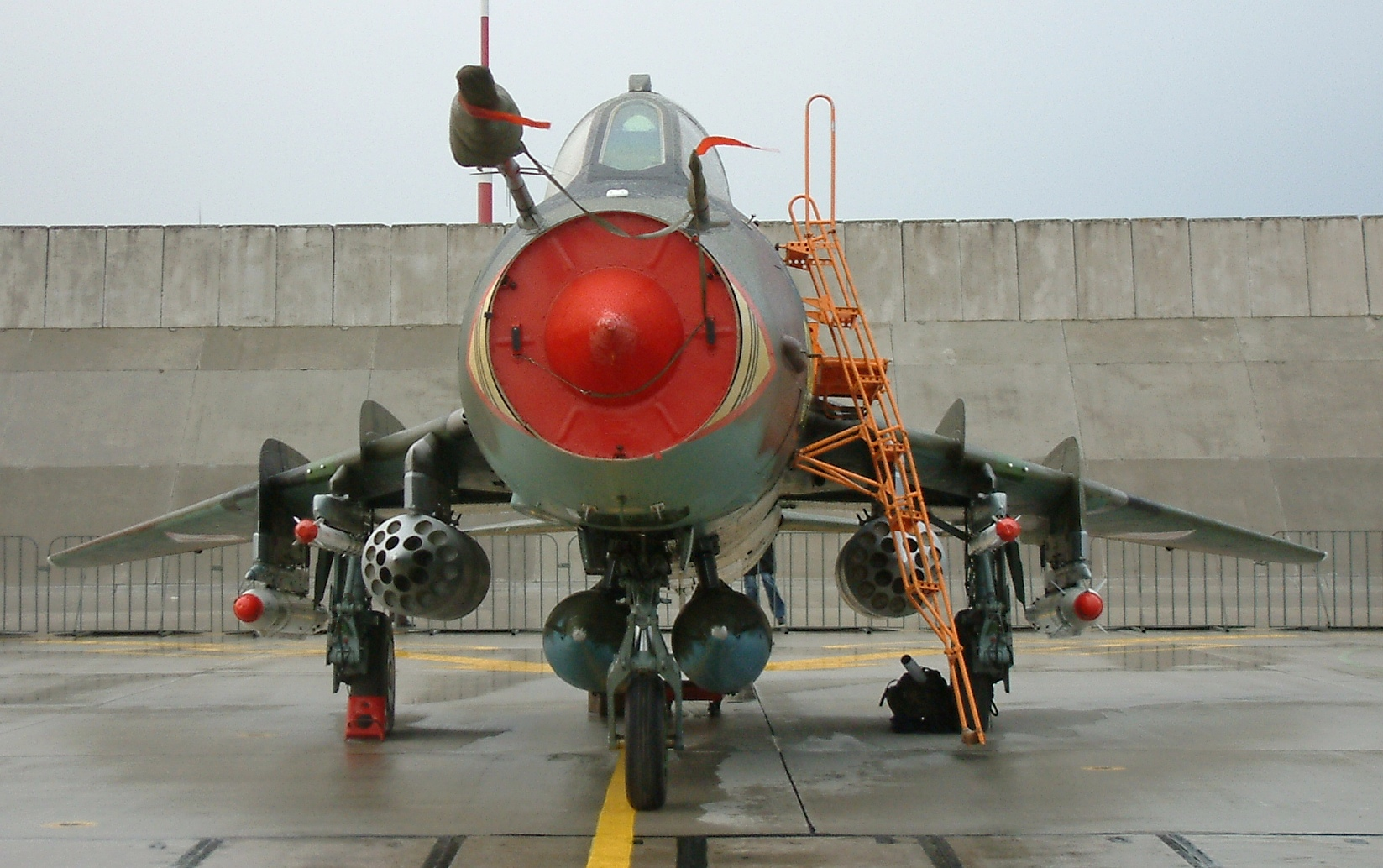
Polish Su-22M4 in the markings of 7th Tactical Sqn.

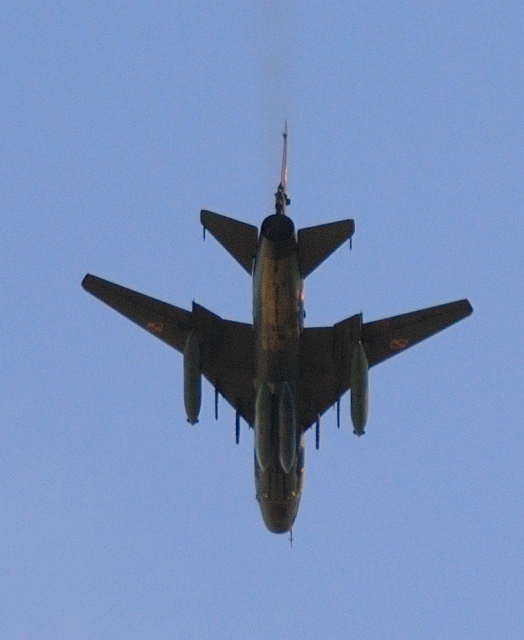
Polish Su-22M4 in flight

Multiple Su-17 variants were examined.

=== Su-7IG (S-22I, "Fitter-B") ===
Su-7BM variable geometry wing demonstrator.

=== Su-17 (S-32, "Fitter-C") ===
Fitter-C was the initial production version, with a dorsal spine similar to that of the Su-7U (carrying wiring and equipment). It was powered by the same Lyulka AL-7F-1 engine as the Su-7. It was manufactured between 1969 and 1973, with a total of 224 built.

=== Su-17M (S-32M, "Fitter-C") ===
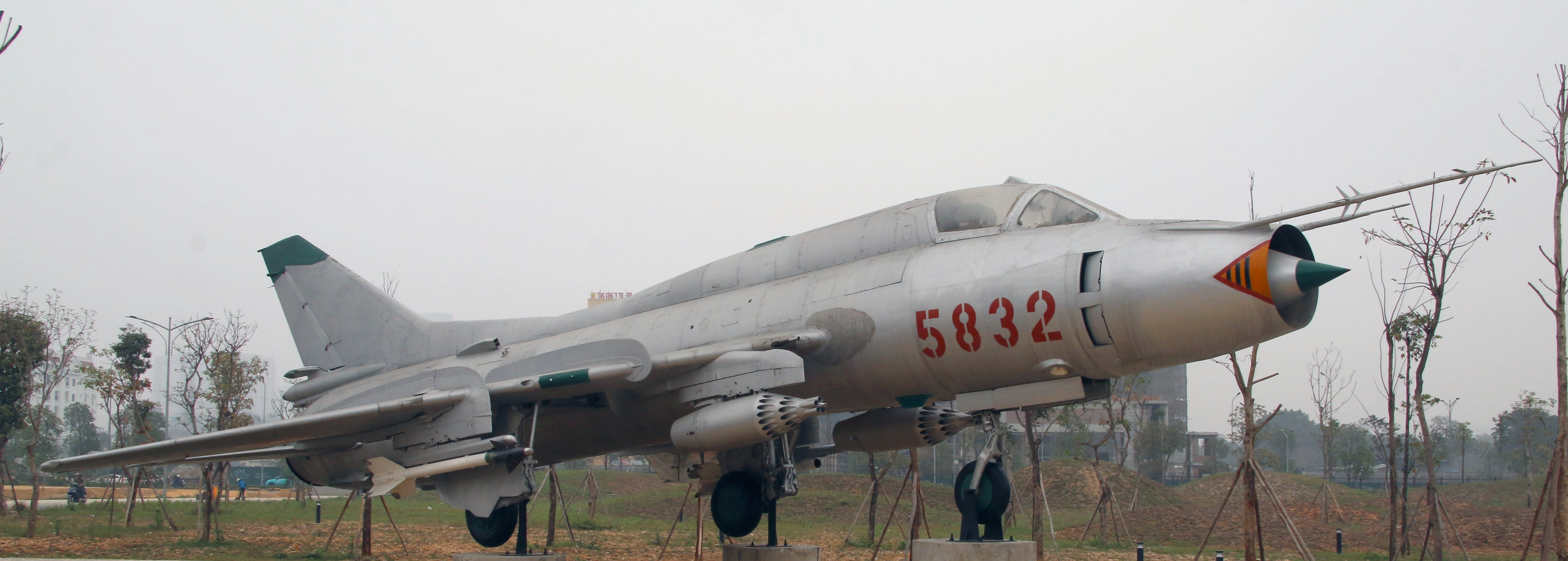
A Vietnamese Su-22M being displayed in the Vietnam Military History Museum.

This version used the Lyulka AL-21F-3 engine, and an updated navigation and attack computer. The Su-7BMK's SRD-5M ranging radar was retained. Twin pitot tubes, angle of attack vane, single brake parachute. The variable-position intake centerbody provided maximum speed of Mach 2.1. This version was first flown on 28 December 1971 by V. S. Soloviev. The export version was designated Su-20, and was first flown on 15 December 1972 by A. N. Isakov. The Su-17M was manufactured between 1972 and 1975, and entered service in 1973. The Su-20 was exported to Egypt, Poland, and Syria. The Su-17M was fitted with a modified fuselage and wing-sweep mechanism (without driveshafts). The fuel system consisted of a central tank, three interconnected, pressurized follower tanks feeding the central tank, and two additional follower tanks in the fixed part of the wing. The Su-17M was fitted with the SPO-10 Sirena-ZM radar warning receiver and the ARK-15 Tobol radio compass.

The combat payload for the Su-17M was increased to four tons with the addition of two extra fuselage hardpoints, providing a total of eight BDZ-57M or MT hardpoints for carrying free-fall bombs. MBDZ-U6-68 hardpoints are available for KMGU submunition containers, S-8 or S-25 rockets. The Su-17M could carry the Kh-28 anti-radiation missile, which, used in concert with the Metel-A ELINT pod enables the aircraft to engage radar-guided air defence systems.

=== Su-17M-28 ===
Testbed for Kh-28 (AS-9 Kyle) anti-radiation missile

=== Su-17MKG ===
Testbed for Kh-25 and Kh-29 missiles

=== Su-17R ===
Small number of Su-17M aircraft equipped to carry reconnaissance pods. Equivalent export version designated Su-20R.

=== Su-17M2 (S-32M2, "Fitter-D") ===
The nose extended 38 cm (15 in), with removed ranging radar and 'drooping' to improve pilot visibility. It was equipped with the Fon-1400 laser rangefinder/marked-target seeker (LRMTS), ASP-17 and PBK-3-17s aiming avionics, RSBN-6S short-range navigation and instrument landing system. It featured an undernose fairing for a DISS-7 Doppler navigation radar. The Su-17M2 first flew on 20 December 1973 with V. S. Ilyushin at the controls. It was manufactured between 1974 and 1977, and it entered service in 1975.

The design of the Su-17M was further modified into what would become the Su-17M2, with three pre-production aircraft used as prototypes. The KN-23 navigation system taken from the MiG-23 was installed, with an IKV inertial attitude indicator, a DISS-7 Doppler velocity sensor, air signal systems, and a V-144 analog computer with its own input panel. With the RSBN-6S Romb-K navigation system and the SAU-22M autopilot, the KN-23 provided the capability of automatically navigating along a route defined by three turning points before heading for the target location. The V-144 stored four sets of coordinates for landing airfields, and made it possible for the aircraft to automatically approach the airfield for landing and descend to an altitude of 50–60 meters prior to manual landing. The SOD-57M transponder was replaced with the newer SO-69. During its service, the SRO-2M transponder was replaced with the newer Parol (Russian for "Password") system. A Fon-1400 laser rangefinder was installed under the inlet cone. The Delta NG missile control system, designed to send command signals to the Kh-23 Grom missile, was integrated into a pod under the wing. The Su-17M2 was fitted with the ASP-17S gunsight and a PBK-3-17S bombsight. The fuel system received a nitrogen pressurizer with a 200 kg capacity increase. Starting from aircraft Nr 03909 a central fuel feed system was introduced with the installation of the ETsN-45 fuel pump. The Su-17M2 was capable of carrying the Kh-25 air-to-ground missile, fitted with the 24N1 laser seeker. This was first tested by retrofitted Su-7BMs and Su-17Ms, designated Su-17MKG. The Su-17M2 could carry two such missiles, one each under the wing, mounted on an APU-68U or UM rack. The missiles were guided using a Prozhektor-1 laser-designator pod. The Su-17M2 had an unofficial nickname, s borodoy, which means "with a beard" in Russian.

=== Su-17M2D ===
This model was a test-fit of the Tumansky/Khatchaturov R-29BS-300 engine (shared with some MiG-23s), with 112.7 kN (25,335 lbf) afterburning thrust, in a bulged rear fuselage. Due to lack of performance advantage and decreased range due to higher fuel consumption, this engine was for export only. This version first flew on 31 January 1975 with A. N. Isakov at the controls. The export variant was designated Su-22 (factory code S-32M2K, NATO "Fitter-F"). It was manufactured between 1977 and 1978.

=== Su-17UM (S-52U, "Fitter-E") ===
This was the first two-seat trainer version, based on the Su-17M2. It featured a deeper fuselage with a windscreen moved forward. It was the same length as the Su-17M. The internal fuel capacity was reduced and the port cannon deleted, but the aircraft retained full avionics and armament. The Su-17UM first flew on 15 August 1975 with V. A. Krechetov at the controls. Test flights revealed longitudinal instability at high angles of attack which was remedied by enlarging the tail fin. The export version with the R-29 engine was designated Su-22U. The Su-17UM was manufactured between 1976 and 1978, and entered service in 1976.

=== Su-17M3 (S-52, "Fitter-H") ===
The Su-17M3 and its export versions represented the most numerous variant, with almost 1,000 built. The M3 was based on the revised airframe of the Su-17UM, adding an avionics bay and an additional fuel tank in place of the rear cockpit. The internal fuel capacity grew to 4850 L (1,280 U.S. gal). The Doppler radar was moved internally, and the fairing was removed. The M3 was equipped with the Klen-P laser rangefinder/target designator. A launch rail for Vympel K-13 or Molniya R-60 air-to-air missiles was added between the two pylons on each wing.

The Su-17M3 first flew on 30 June 1976 with V. A. Krechetov at the controls. Its export version with the R-29 engine and downgraded avionics (equivalent to those of the Su-17M2) was designated Su-22M (factory designation S-52K, NATO "Fitter-J") and first flew on 24 May 1977 with E. S. Soloviev at the controls. An export version with Su-17M3 avionics was designated Su-22M3 (factory S-52MK). The Su-17 was manufactured from 1976 to 1981, and the Su-22M from 1978 to 1984.

The Su-17M3 was planned at the same time as the UM trainer. Fuel capacity was increased by 260 kg. Starting from the 38th batch the tailfin was raised with a radiotransparent guide and a fin was added on the underside of the tail to improve high-speed stability. A new KN-23-1 navigation system, the SAU-22M1 autopilot and the RV-15 (A-031) radio altimeter were added. Some aircraft later received an RSDN-10 Skip-2 (A-720) long-range radio navigation system, with its antenna installed on the tailfin's leading edge. The SARPP-12GM flight recorder was replaced with the Tester-UZ recorder, and the SPO-10 radar warning receiver was replaced with the SPO-15A (izdeliye L006L) Beryoza. A Klyon-PS combined laser rangefinder/designator was installed, alongside the ASP-17BTs sight. The Su-17M3 could carry an SPS-141 (or the 142–143) Siren or an SPS-141MVG Gvozdika ECM pod. Infrared countermeasures could be deployed via KDS-23 launchers. The BSPPU fire-control system was used, which would control SPPU-22-01 gun pods suspended on the wings to automatically stay on target up to a depression angle of 30°. Two additional hardpoints were placed under the fuselage, with S-52-8812-300 pylons, on which BDZ-57MT or MTA racks could hold APU-68UMs, which in turn could carry Kh-23M or Kh-25 missiles. These hardpoints would be capable of carrying the Kh-25ML or MR missiles, as well as the Kh-29L, mounted on an AKU-58 ejector rack. Some of the Su-17M3s were modified to the Su-17M3P standard, which would enable them to carry up to four Kh-27PS, two on the wings and two under the fuselage, or two Kh-58 anti-radiation missiles, which could be carried only on the fuselage pylons. A Vyuga-17 (L-086) target designator pod could be installed under the fuselage, with its receiver integrated into the nose. The BDZ-57MT racks could also hold ordinary ordnance, such as the UB-16, -32 or the B-13L rocket pods, free-fall bombs, KMGU submunition containers, and the SPPU-22-01 gun pods. In a somewhat unconventional manner, the S-52-8307-200 pylons could be mounted on the aircraft, on which the gun pods would be installed in a rearwards-facing manner, pointed downwards at 23°, and fired as the aircraft flew away from ground targets. The first Su-17M3s were unpainted with the silver color from the anodized duralumin. Later Su-17M3s, as well as all variants that followed, were painted with a green camouflage pattern on the top, and blue on the bottom. This camouflage pattern eventually found its way to all Su-17s in service, and the paint jobs were done at repair plants. The camouflage pattern – the locations of the paint dots – was not standardized, thus each aircraft had its own "unique" camouflage. The Su-17M3 would also have a trainer variant designated the Su-17UM3.

=== Su-17UM (S-52UM) ===
The initial trainer version with the same avionics suite as the Su-17M. The export version was designated Su-22UM3 with R-29 engine, and Su-22UM3K with the AL-21 engine. It was manufactured from 1978 to 1982.

=== Su-17UM3 (S-52UM3, "Fitter-G") ===
This was a revised trainer with the same avionics suite as the Su-17M3. The Su-17UM3 first flew on 21 September 1978 with Yu. A. Yegorov at the controls. The export version was designated Su-22UM3 with R-29 engine, and Su-22UM3K with the AL-21 engine. It was manufactured between 1978 and 1982.

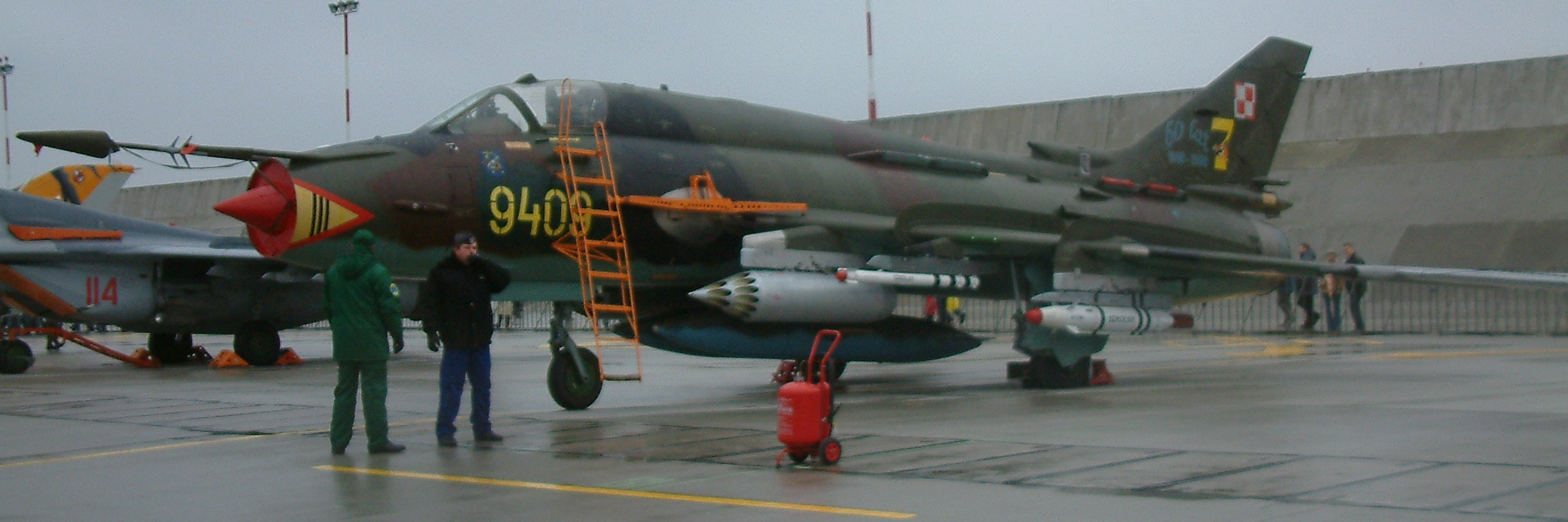
Polish Su-22M4 in markings of 7th Tactical Sqn.

=== Su-17M4 (S-54, "Fitter-K") ===
This was the final production version, with upgraded avionics, including RSDN navigation (similar to LORAN), beacon navigation, inertial navigation, radio compass, and SPO-15LE radar warning receiver. It featured additional fuselage inlets (including a ram-air inlet at the base of the fin) to improve engine cooling airflow, and a fixed air intake shock cone. Many aircraft were equipped for the use of video-guided missiles and BA-58 Vjuga pod for anti-radiation missiles. The Su-17M4 was equipped with the AL-21F-3 engine, and its export version was designated Su-22M4 (factory S-54K). The Su-17M4 first flew on 19 June 1980 with Yu. A. Yegorov at the controls. The Su-17M4 was manufactured from 1981 to 1988, and the Su-22M4 from 1983 to 1990.

The Su-17M4 differed from the Su-17M3 in the removal of the inlet cone control system, which restricted the maximum allowable flight speed to Mach 1.75. The inlet cone housed the more powerful Klyon-54 laser rangefinder. The avionics differed significantly from its predecessors – a new A-312 Radikal NP close- and A-720 Skip-2 long-range navigation systems, an ARK-22 radio compass, an MRP-66 radio beacon receiver, an RV-21 Impuls (A-035) radio altimeter, and the DISS-7 Doppler velocity sensor, air signal systems, the IKV-8 inertial attitude indicator inherited from the Su-17M2. The Vyuga target designator pod could be carried in a BA-58 pod under the fuselage, which would enable the use of the Kh-27PS and Kh-58U or E missiles. Some Su-17M4s were fitted with the IT-23M indicator, which would transmit video from the Tubus-2 seeker on the Kh-29T missile to facilitate target acquisition.

=== Su-17M5 (S-56) ===
This was a proposed upgraded variant with a new fixed wing based on the swing wing at 45 degrees sweep, new avionics, and an AL-31F turbofan. It was not built.

=== Su-20 ===
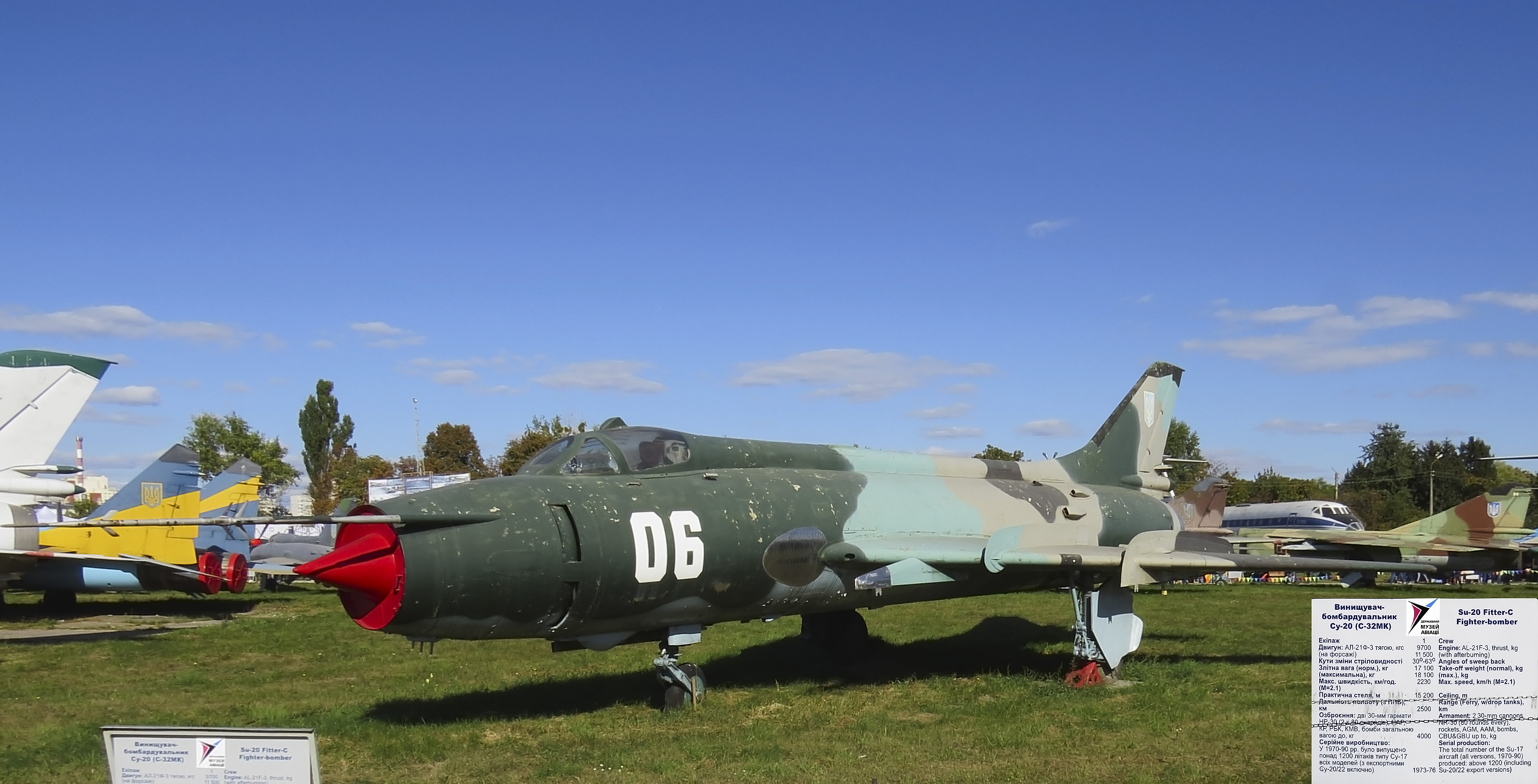
Sukhoi Su-20 'Fitter-C' fighter-bomber at Ukrainian State Aviation Museum in Kyiv

This was the initial export version of the Su-17M (S-32MK).

=== Su-22M5 ===
This was a Russian-French upgrade package offered for existing aircraft with modernized cockpit, HOTAS, improved avionic systems, and laser rangefinder replaced by Phazotron/Thomson-CSF radar.

=== Su-22U ===
The S-52U two-seat combat-trainer, export version of the Su-17UM, with a completely re-designed nose housing the tandem cockpits for student and instructor. Gun pods such as the GSh-23 based UPK-23 and SPPU-22 were utilized by the Su-17, Su-20, and Su-22. The SPPU-22 ground attack variant featured 30 degrees of traverse.

An experimental version of the Su-20 was built with fixed wings attached to an Su-17M fuselage, in an effort to increase Payload/range performance by eliminating the weight of the wing sweep system. Good results were obtained in flight tests in 1973, but further development was cancelled.

Tactical Reconnaissance versions of all variants could be made by fitting the KKR (Kombinirovannyi Konteiner Razvedky – combined reconnaissance pod) on the centre-line hardpoint.

=== In-house OKB designations ===
S-22I
The first prototype "Variable-Geometry" Su-7, converted from a production Su-7BM, first flown on 2 August 1966.
S-32
The initial production version, dubbed Su-17 by the VVS – Soviet Air Forces.
S-32M
The Su-17 with the Lyul'ka AL-21F engine and re-structured fuselage plus several smaller modifications, resulting in a greater fuel capacity and more weapons stations.
S-32MK
The Su-20 export version with revised armament options, and less sophisticated avionics. First flight: 15 December 1972.
S-32MK Hybrid
Single aircraft (f/n 9500) built with fuselage of S-32MK and fixed wings of Su-7BMK. Offered to customers as cheaper/less complex alternative to Su-20, but no production.
S-32M2
The Su-17M with improved flying controls and weapon-aiming equipment. Production carried out from 1975 to 1977
S-32M2K
The Su-22 export version of the Su-17M2 with a Tumansky R-29BS-300 engine.
S-32M2D
An Su-17 tested with ski landing gear, similar to that used on the S-26 (Su-7), used for [very] rough field landing and takeoff tests.
Su-52U
The Su-17UM/Su-22U two-seat combat-trainer version with a completely re-designed nose housing the tandem cockpits for student and instructor.
S-52
In a reverse development the trainer modifications were adapted for a new Attack variant, the Su-17M3.
S-52K
An export variant of the S-52, given the designation Su-22M.
S-52M3K
Series production Su-22M3 aircraft with laser range-finder and avionics mods.
S-52UK
The trainer variant with all the S-32M2K structural modifications and a reduced weapons portfolio.
S-52UM3
The Su-17UM3 for the VVS with avionics and aero-dynamic changes.
S-52UM3K
The export version of the Su-17UM3.
S-52R
Tactical Reconnaissance Su-17M3R with a KKR (Kombinirovanny Konteiner Razvedy – combined reconnaissance pod) on the centre-line pylon
S-54
Production Su-17M4 fighter-bombers.
S-54K
Export Su-17M4s, designated Su-22M4.
S-54R
Tactical reconnaissance Su-17M4R with a KKR (Kombinirovanny Konteiner Razvedy – combined reconnaissance pod) on the centre-line pylon.

== Operators ==
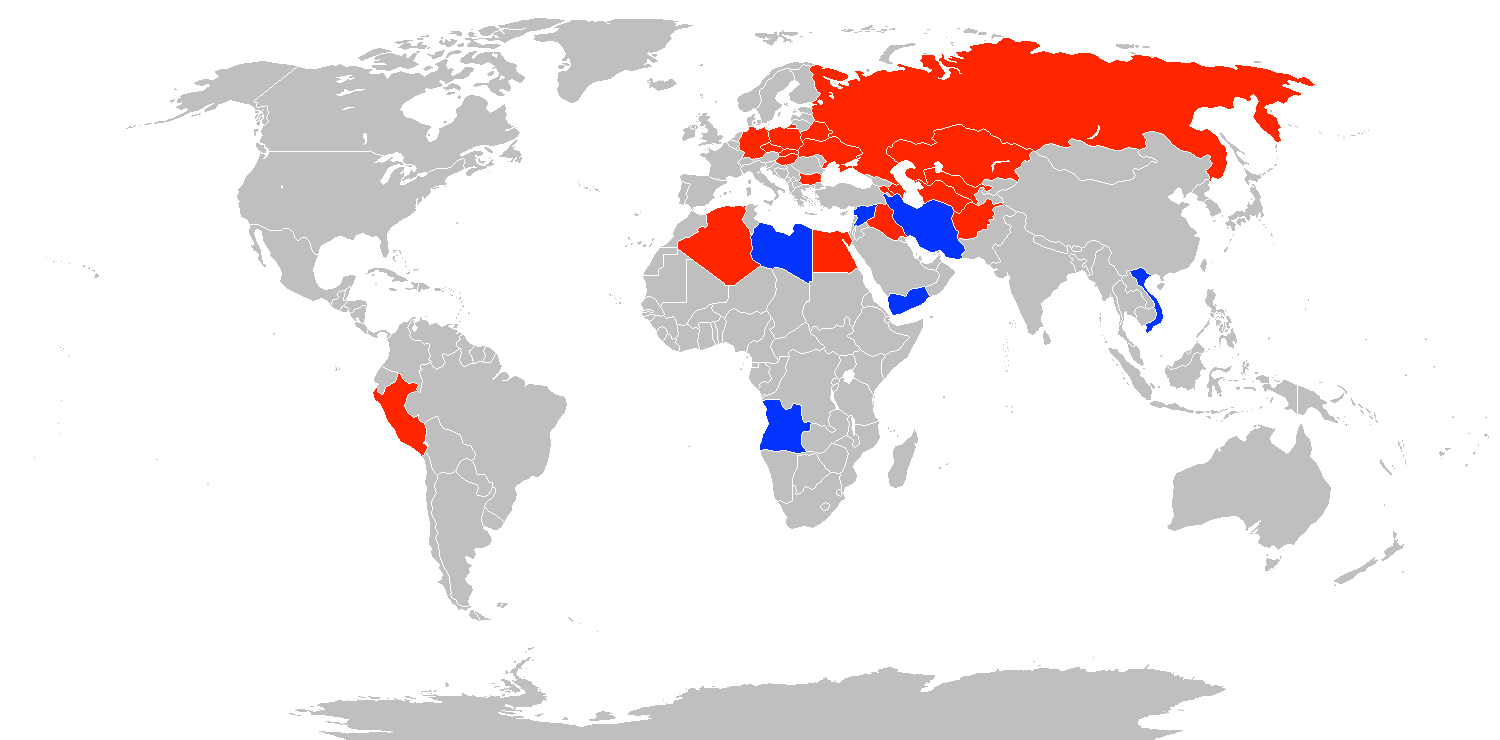
Operating nations of the Su-17, Su-20, and Su-22; Current operators Former operators

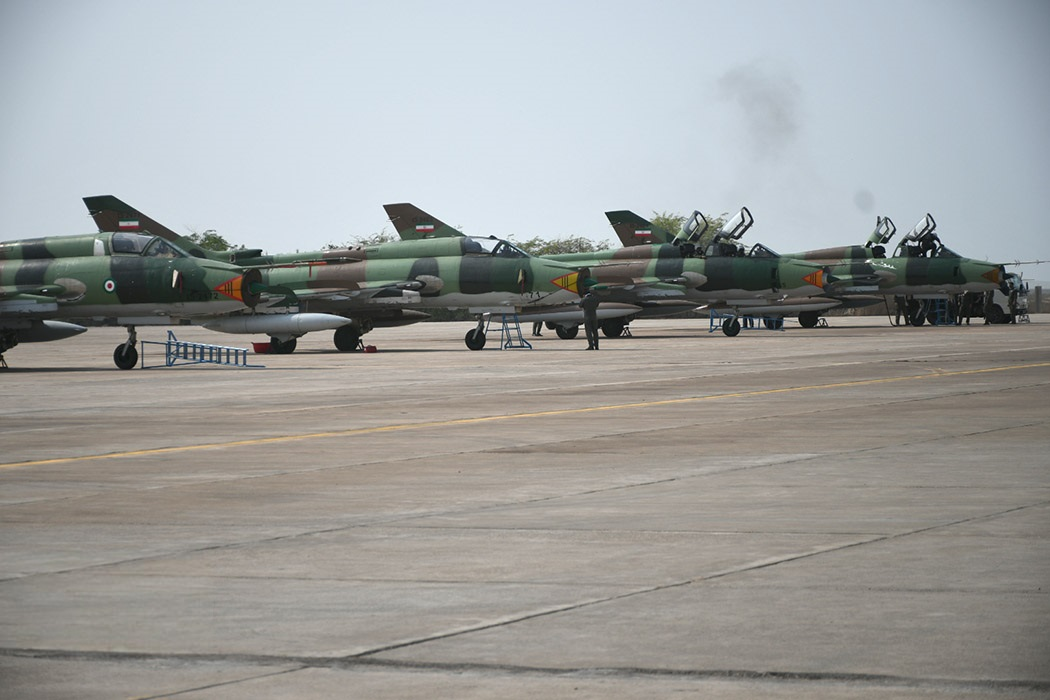
Iranian Su-22s in 2023

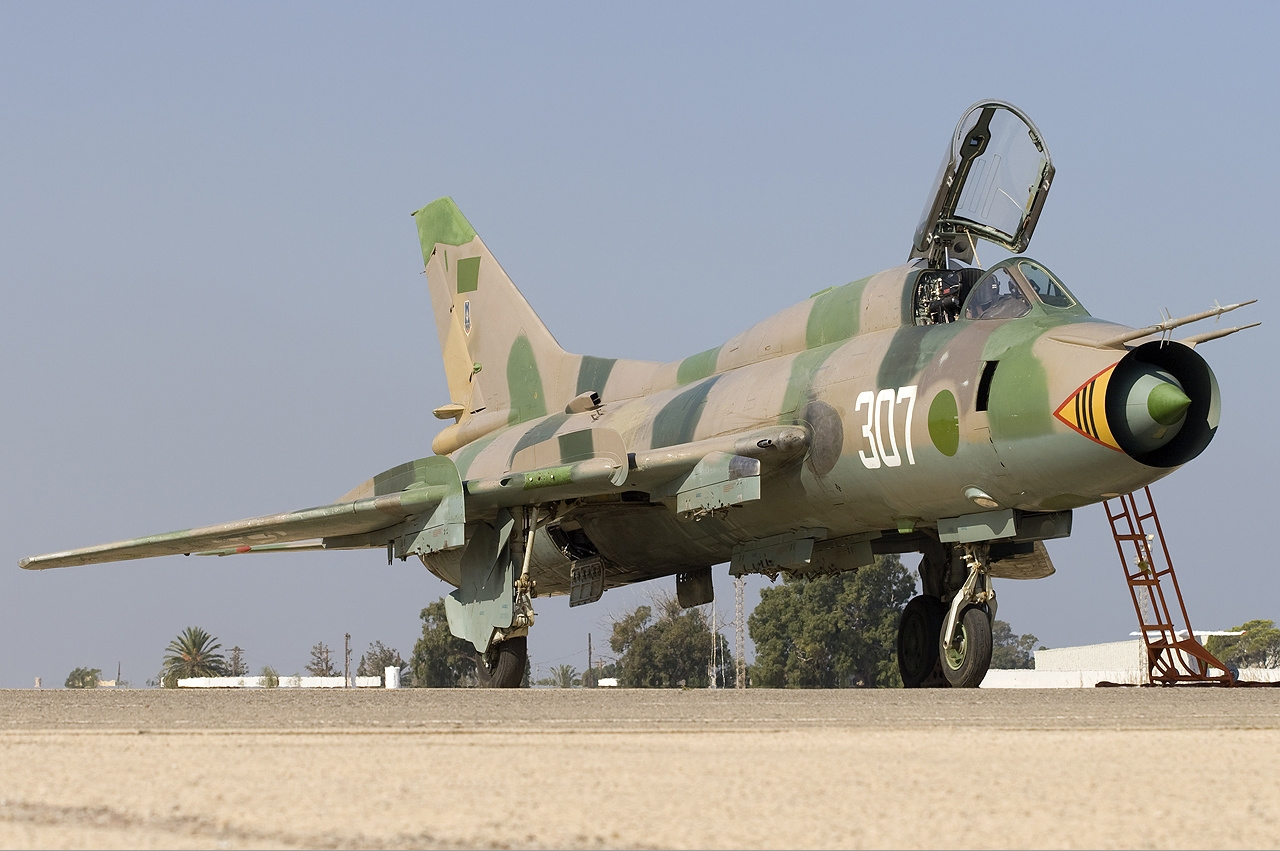
Former Libyan Arab Republic Air Force Sukhoi Su-22M

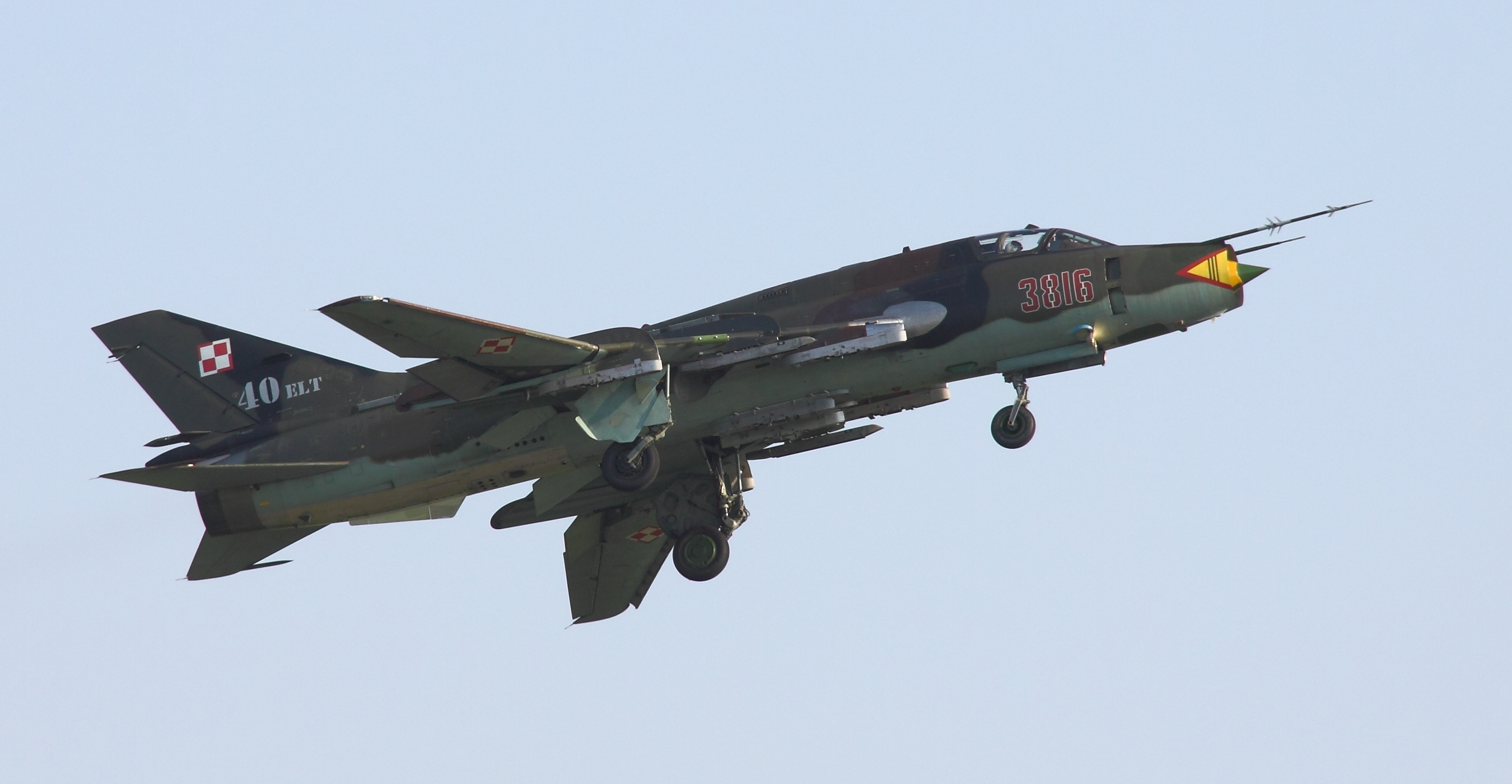
Polish Su-22M4

Angola: The National Air Force of Angola operates 10 Su-22 variants.
Iran: The Aerospace Force of the Islamic Revolutionary Guard Corps (IRGC-AF) operates the Iranian Su-22 fleet. The aircraft have military identification numbers that are prefixed '15-' Iran received 40 Su-20/22s from Iraq in 1991. While non-operational for several years, in 2013 Iran started an overhaul program. In March 2015, it seems that some of the IRGC-AF Su-22s were transferred to the Syrian Arab Air Force to fight in the Syrian Civil War. In July 2018 they successfully overhauled and modernized 10 Su-22s, giving them the ability to carry smart bombs, fire precision-guided munitions, transfer data from UAVs, and technology necessary to utilize air-launched cruise missiles with a range of 1500 km. Iran currently possesses 9 Su-22 aircraft.
Libya: The Libyan Air Force operated as many as 90 Su-22 aircraft, with around 40 Su-22M3 and Su-22UM3K aircraft in service at the beginning of 2011. During the Libyan Civil War, the Gaddafi regime used Su-22s in combat operations. As of 2025, 1 Su-22 remained in service.
Syria: Inherited aircraft from the Syrian Arab Air Force, but almost all aircraft were destroyed either through combat or by Israeli strikes. In late 2025, the World Air Forces publication by FlightGlobal, which tracks the aircraft inventories of the world's air forces and publishes its counts annually, removed all of the Syrian Air Force's aircraft from its World Air Forces 2026 report. In August 2026 a video surfaced of two Su-22s in service with the Syrian Air Force.
Vietnam: Three regiments of Su-22UM3K and Su-22M4 aircraft served with the Vietnam Air Force. As of 2026, 20 Su-22s remained in service.
Yemen: The Yemeni Air Force inherited Su-22s from both North and South Yemen, following the 1994 civil war. In 1996, the remaining Su-22s and Su-22Ms were retired. At least four Su-17M4s were bought second-hand from Ukraine around 1994. As of 2026, 15 aircraft remained operational.

=== Former operators ===
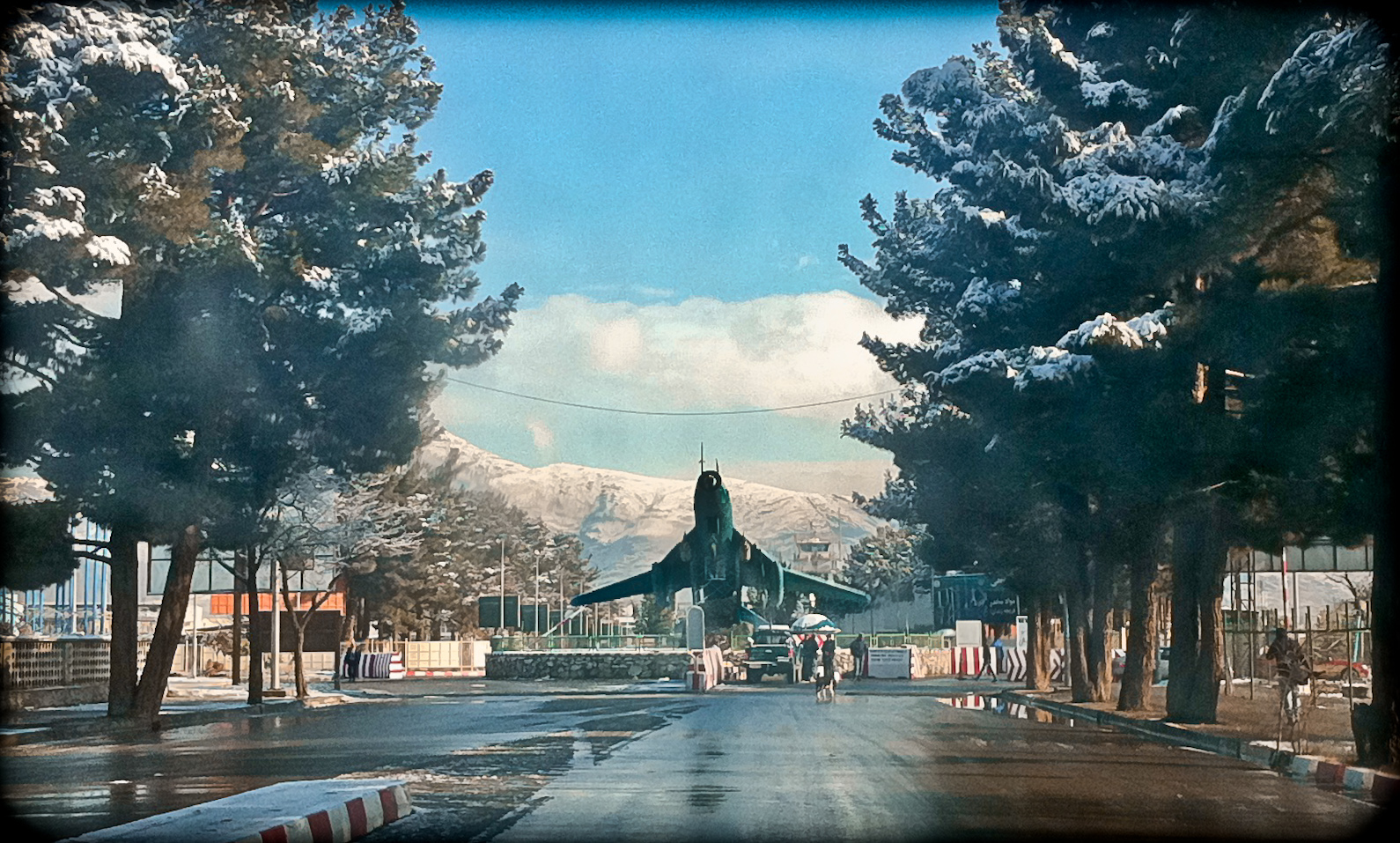
A former Afghan Air Force Su-22M4 that now sits as a gate guardian at the entrance of Hamid Karzai International Airport

Afghanistan: The Soviet Union sent more than 70 aircraft to the Democratic Republic of Afghanistan for service with the Afghan Air Force. These included 45 Su-22M4s delivered from 1984.
Algeria
Georgia
Armenia
Azerbaijan
Ba'athist Syria: 28 Su-22 aircraft served with the Syrian Arab Air Force prior to the Syrian Civil War. In late 2024, 39 Su-22s remained in service. The Syrian government of Al-Assad fell to rebels in late 2024, and the Syrian Arab Air Force was dismantled.
Belarus: The Belarusian Air Force inherited Su-17s from the Soviet Air Force.
Bulgaria: Bulgarian Air Force. The Bulgarian Air Force operated 18 Su-22M4 and five Su-22UM aircraft.

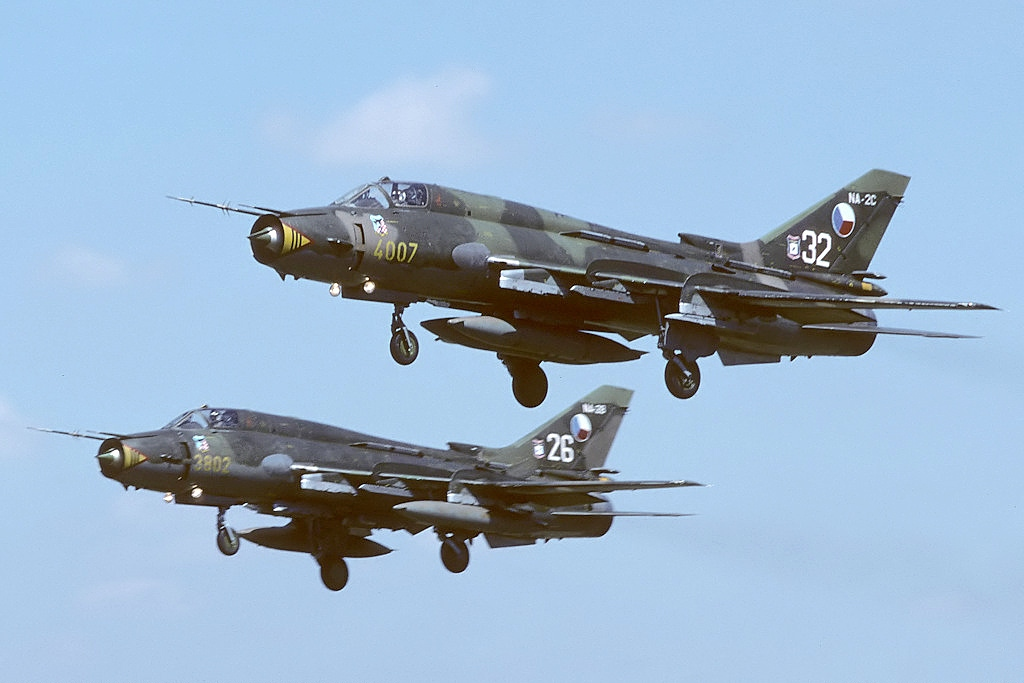
Czech Air Force Su-22M4

Czechoslovakia: Czechoslovak Air Force. The Czechoslovak Air Force's Su-22 inventory (49 Su-22M4s and 8 Su-22UM3Ks in 1992) was split between the Czech Republic and Slovakia in 1993.
Czech Republic: Czech Air Force. The Czech Air Force inherited 31 Su-22M4s and five Su-22UM3Ks. All were retired in 2002.

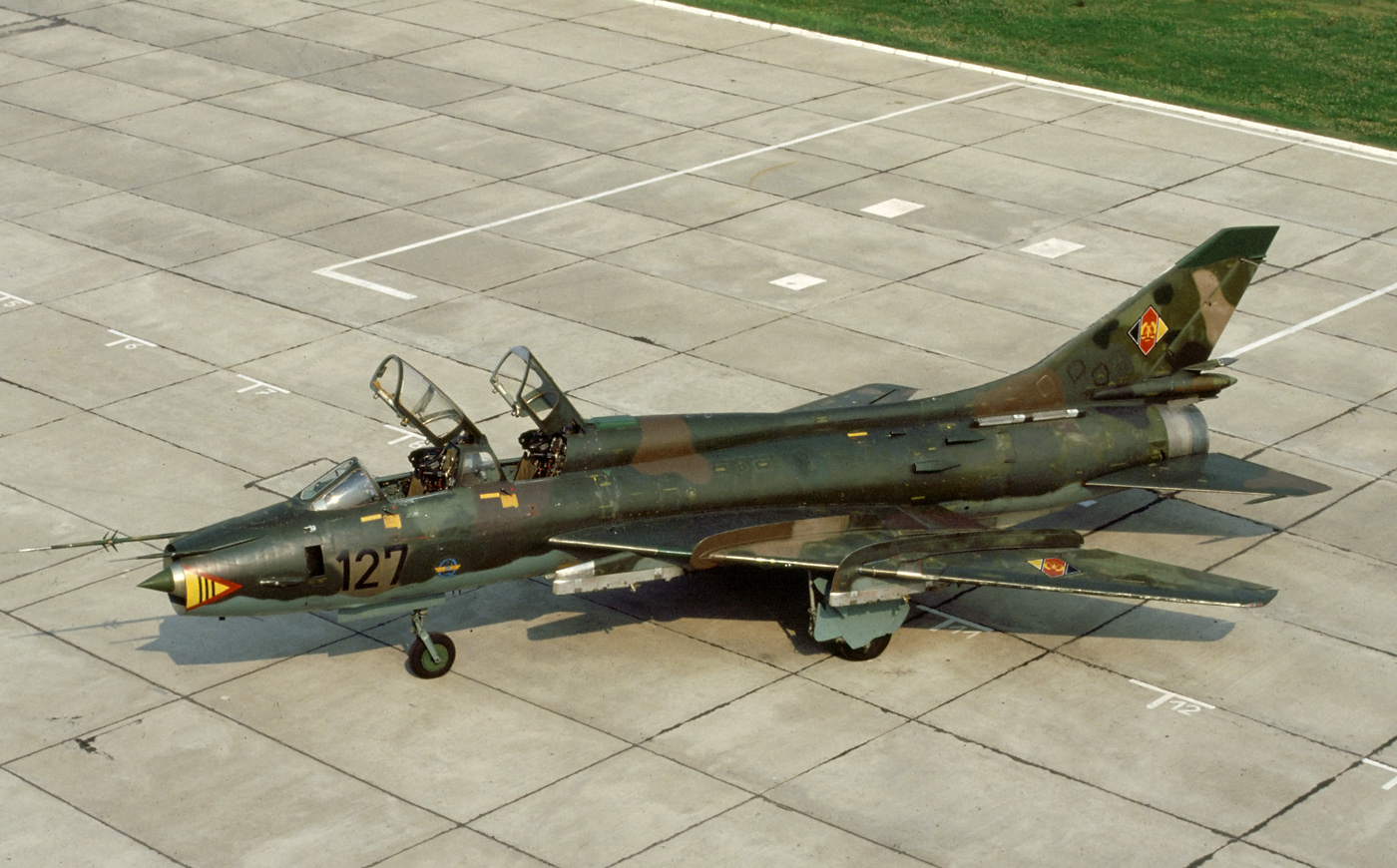
An East German Su-22

East Germany: The Air Forces of the National People's Army. East Germany operated 48 Su-22M4s and 8 Su-22UM-3Ks until unification, when they were transferred to the Luftwaffe.
• Volksmarine. The East German navy operated eight Su-22M-4Ks and two Su-22UM-3K aircraft.
Egypt: The Egyptian Air Force operated 48 Su-20/22 aircraft, although all have been withdrawn, replaced by the F-4 Phantom II and General Dynamics F-16 Fighting Falcon.
Germany: Su-22 aircraft were inherited from East Germany, although these did not serve in the Luftwaffe, but some were painted with a Luftwaffe color scheme for test and evaluation. Two Su-20s were also purchased from Egypt for evaluation and painted with Luftwaffe markings.
• German Navy. Ex-Volksmarine aircraft.

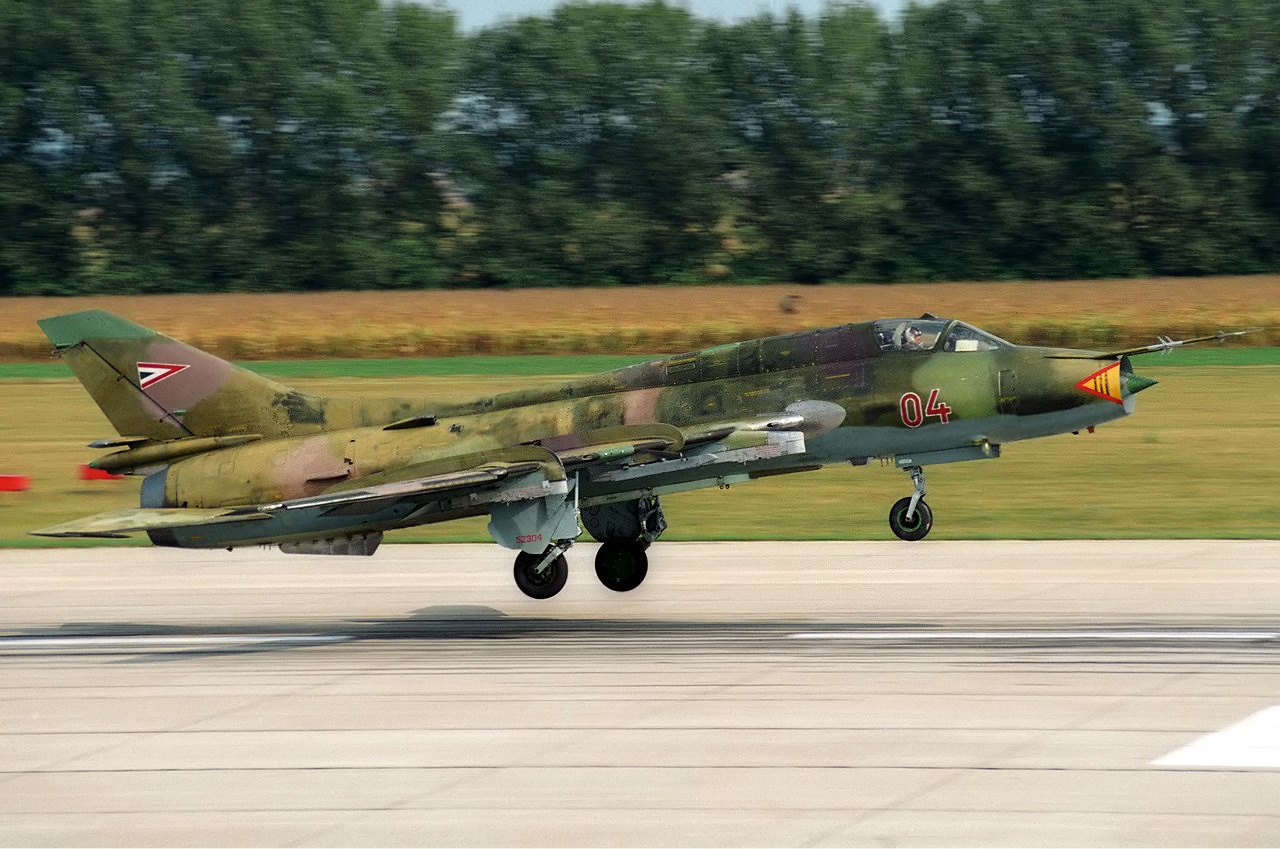
Hungarian Su-22M3

Hungarian People's Republic: The Hungarian People's Army Air Force maintained 12 Su-22M3 and three Su-22UM3 aircraft from 1983. Two single seat and one training aircraft crashed.
Hungary: Aircraft were inherited from the Hungarian People's Republic. They were withdrawn from service in 1997.
Iraq: The Iraqi Air Force received various Su-22 models, of which 40 were impounded by Iran after escaping the Gulf War air campaign in 1991. Some of the planes that survived the Gulf War of 1991 were later scrapped following the 2003 invasion of Iraq.
• No. 1 Squadron IqAF – "as of September 1980, the Iraqi Air Force's No. 1 Squadron was still equipped with 16 out of 18 Sukhoi Su-20s Iraq acquired in 1973."
• No. 44 Squadron IqAF – flying Su-20/22s in September 1980.
Kazakhstan: Su-17 aircraft were inherited by the Armed Forces of the Republic of Kazakhstan, but never put into service.
North Yemen: In November 1979, North Yemeni president Ali Abdullah Saleh concluded an arms deal supplying the Yemen Arab Republic Air Force with 14 Su-22Ms. 14 additional Su-22s were ordered in the 1980s. A few Su-22M3s were delivered weeks before the beginning of the 1994 civil war.

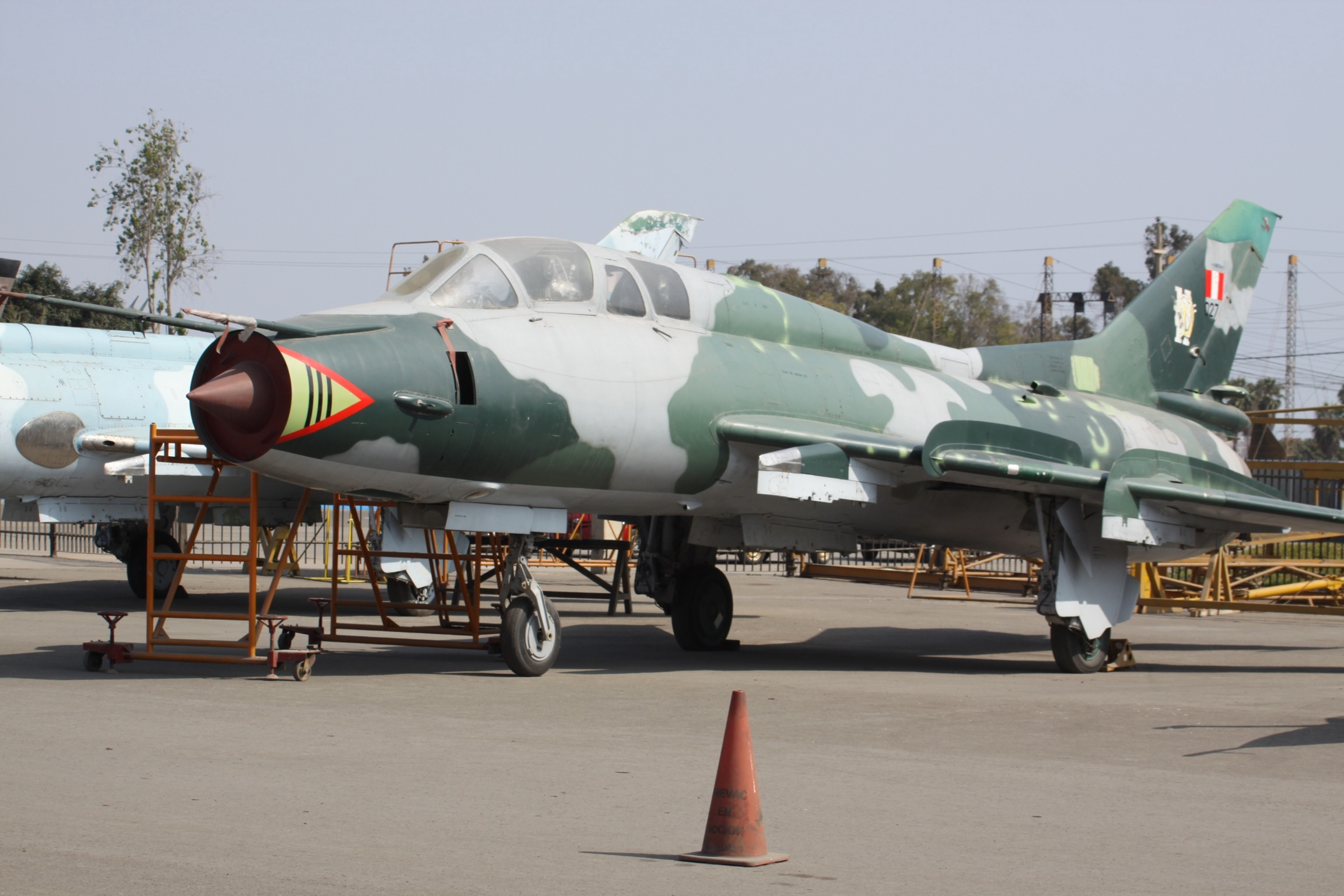
Su-22UM of the Peruvian Air Force

Peru: The Peruvian Air Force acquired 32 Sukhoi Su-22A, 4 Su-22U, 16 Su-22M and 3 Su-22UM aircraft between 1977 and 1980. Retired in 2006, 11 remain in reserve status.
Poland: The Polish Air Force operates 12 Su-22M4 and 6 Su-22UM3K aircraft of 120 delivered, as of 2025. Other airframes sit in warehouses. Poland operated 27 Su-20s from 1974 until the 1990s. Poland retired all of its remaining Su-22s in September 2025.
Russia: The Russian Air Force inherited Soviet Su-17 aircraft, but withdrew the type from service. At least one example remains flying as a chase plane operated by Sukhoi at its KnAAPO facility.
• Russian Naval Aviation

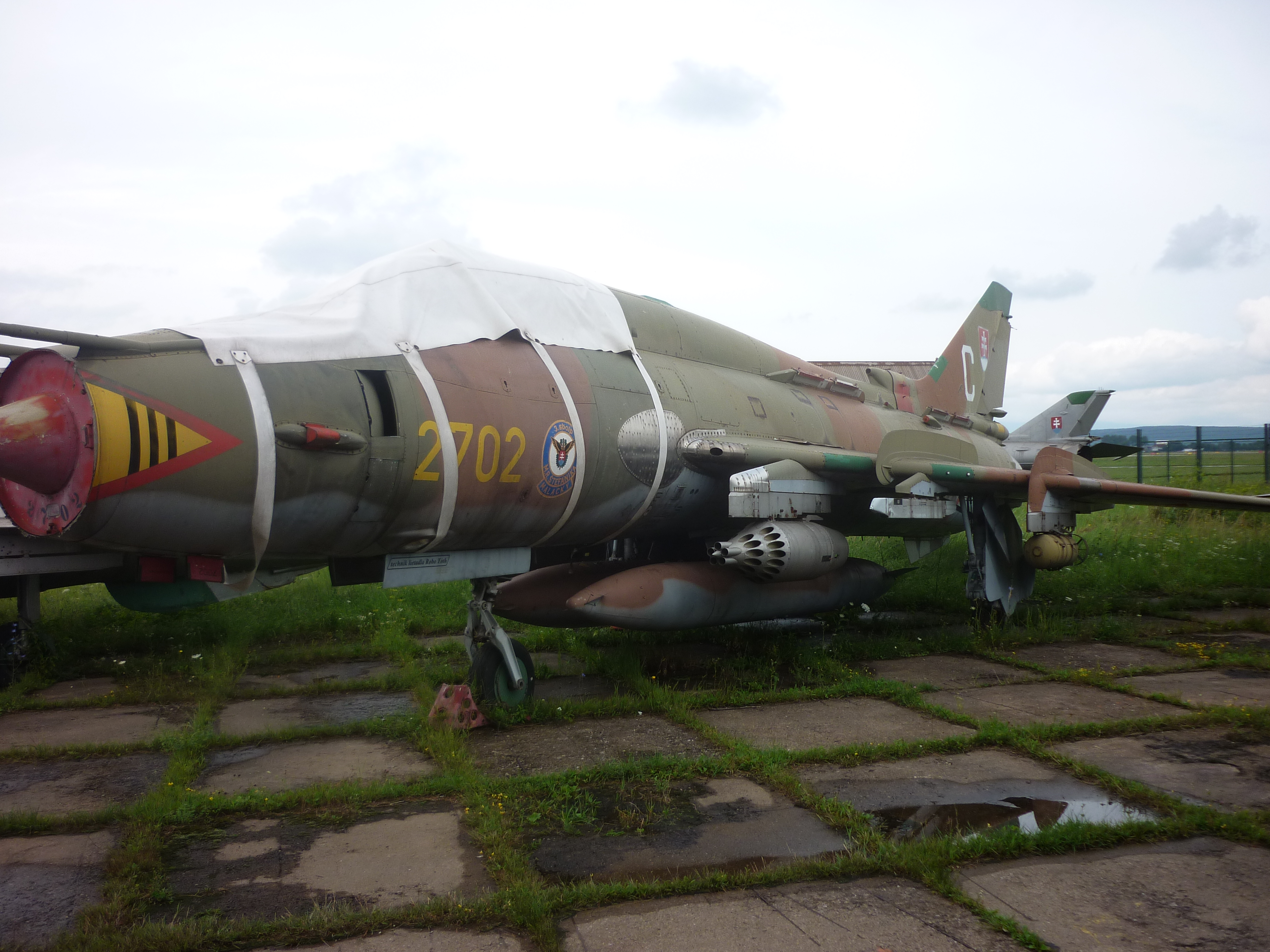
Retired Slovak Su-22M4

Slovakia: The Slovak Air Force inherited 18 Su-22M4 and three Su-22UM3K aircraft from Czechoslovakia in 1993. In 1999, six Su-22M4 followed by four Su-22M4 and one Su-22UM3K in 2001 were sold to Angola while the rest of the fleet was grounded and is used in museum exhibits and as teaching aids in flight schools.
South Yemen: The People's Democratic Republic of Yemen Air Force received its first 12 Su-22s around 1976. In addition, 40 Su-22Ms, Su-22M3s and Su-22UM3Ks were received between 1982 and 1986. Lastly, 12 to 14 Su-22M4Ks were delivered, probably around 1989.
Turkmenistan: Su-17 aircraft were inherited by the Military of Turkmenistan after the breakup of the Soviet Union, but they were never put into service.

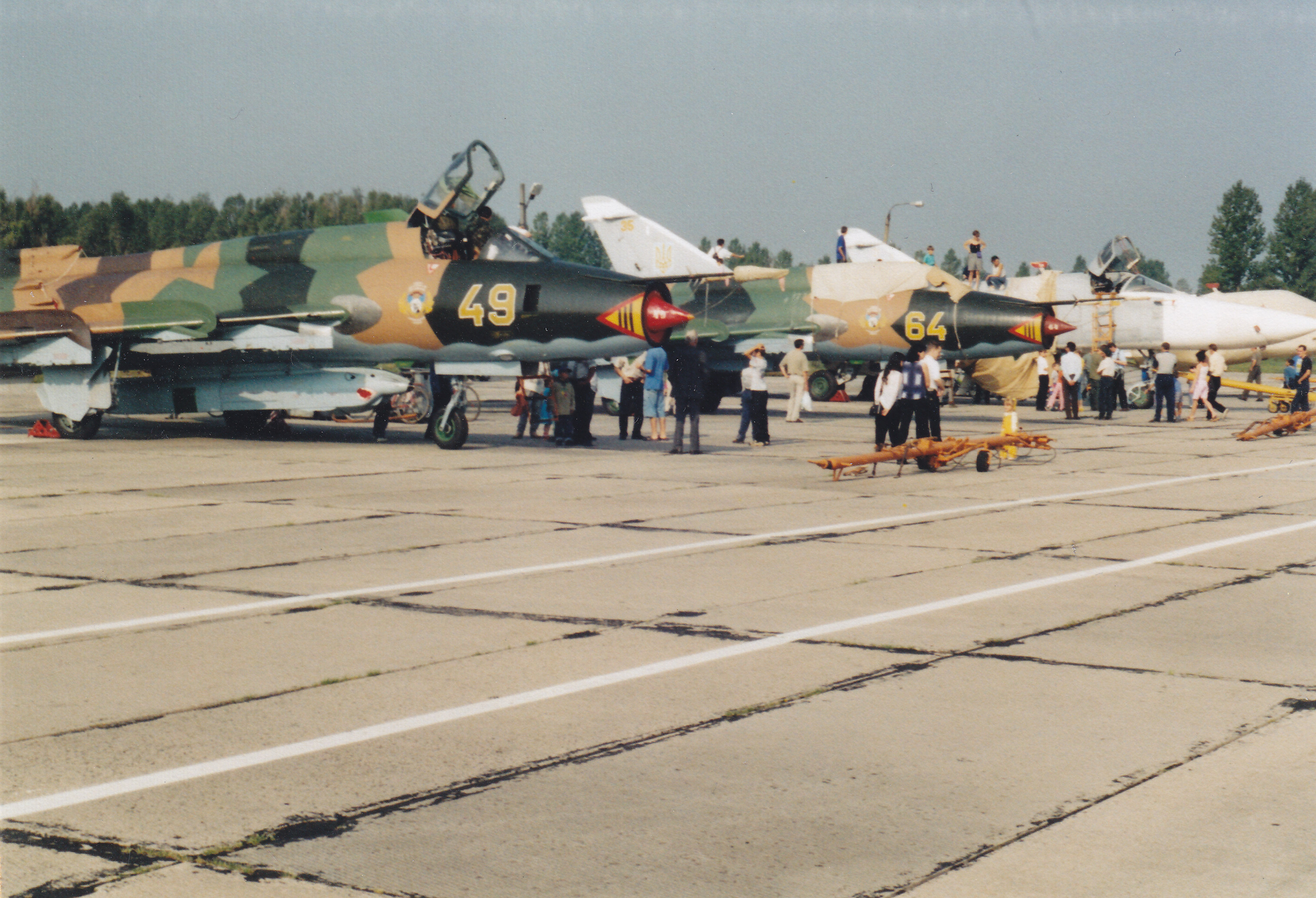
Ukrainian Su-17M4R and Su-17UM3 at Kolomyia air base in 2001

Ukraine: Approximately 50 Su-17M3, M4R and UM3 aircraft were inherited by the Ukrainian Air Force from the Soviet Union. All were retired from active service by 2004. Some were scrapped and others put in storage. In 2005–2007, 24 S-17M4R/UM3s underwent overhaul and were sold to Yemen and Vietnam. The remaining 13 aircraft in storage are located at Shkilnyi Airfield, Odesa and the Zaporizhian aircraft repair plant. As of 2016, a single Su-17UM3 was operated by the plant to train pilots and to test equipment.
Soviet Union:
• Soviet Air Force
• Soviet Naval Aviation
(The Soviet Union's Su-17s were passed onto its successor states.)
Uzbekistan: Su-17 aircraft were inherited by the Military of Uzbekistan. All are retired and stored at Chirchiq.

== Specifications (Su-17M4) ==
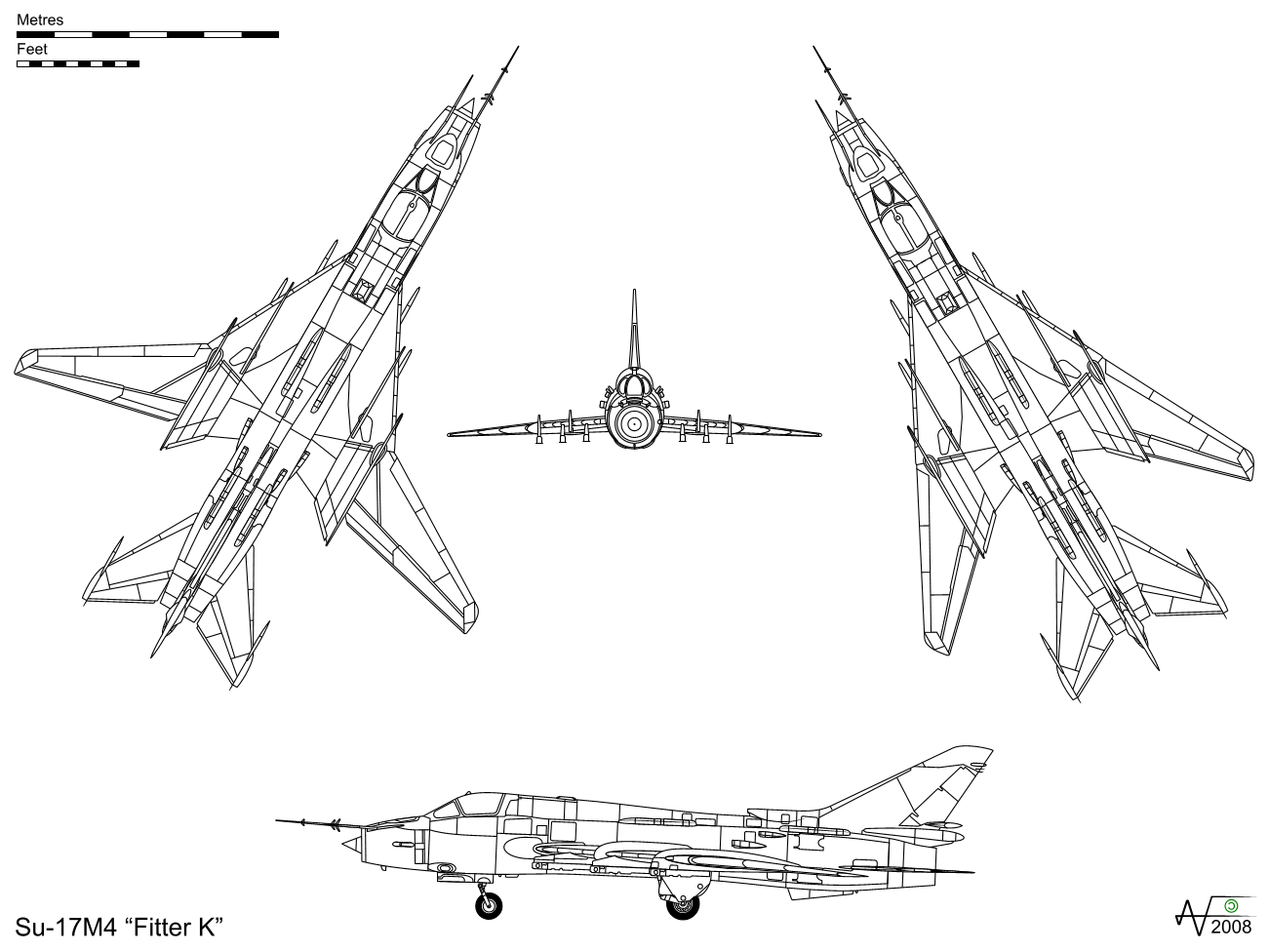
Drawing of the Su-17M4 "Fitter K", with plan view of wings swept and spread

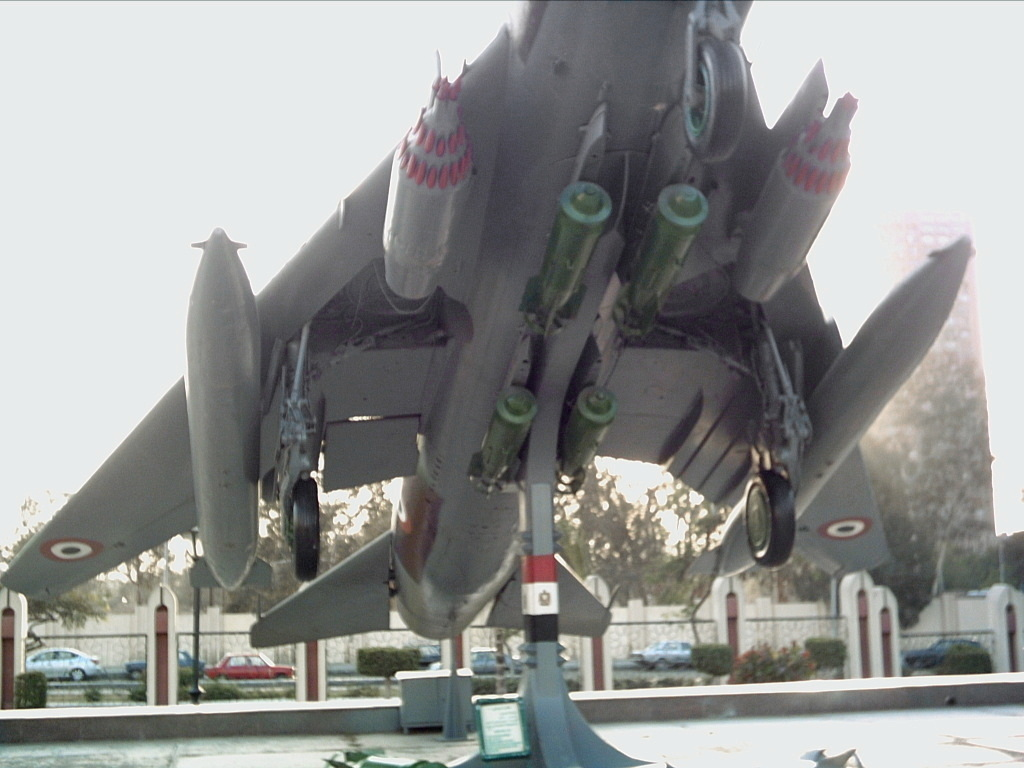
Egyptian Air Force Su-20 armed with four 250 kg bombs, two rocket pods, and fitted with two external fuel tanks.

Data from Sukhoi, Wilson, deagel.com

General characteristics

- Crew: 1
- Length: 19.02 m (62 ft 5 in)
- Wingspan: 13.68 m (44 ft 11 in) wings spread

10.02 m (33 ft) wings swept

- Height: 5.12 m (16 ft 10 in)
- Wing area: 38.5 m^{2} (414 sq ft) wings spread

34.5 m^{2} (371 sq ft) wings swept

- Airfoil: root: TsAGI SR-3S (5.9%); tip: TsAGI SR-3S (4.7%)
- Empty weight: 12,160 kg (26,808 lb)
- Gross weight: 16,400 kg (36,156 lb)
- Max takeoff weight: 19,430 kg (42,836 lb)
- Fuel capacity: 3,770 kg (8,311 lb)
- Powerplant: 1 × Lyulka AL-21F-3 afterburning turbojet engine, 76.4 kN (17,200 lbf) thrust dry, 109.8 kN (24,700 lbf) with afterburner

Performance

- Maximum speed: 1,400 km/h (870 mph, 760 kn) / M1.13 at sea level

1,860 km/h (1,160 mph; 1,000 kn) at altitude

- Combat range: 1,150 km (710 mi, 620 nmi) hi-lo-hi attack with 2,000 kg (4,409 lb) warload
- Ferry range: 2,300 km (1,400 mi, 1,200 nmi)
- Service ceiling: 14,200 m (46,600 ft)
- g limits: +7
- Rate of climb: 230 m/s (45,000 ft/min)
- Wing loading: 443 kg/m^{2} (91 lb/sq ft)
- Thrust/weight: 0.68

Armament

- Guns: **2 × 30 mm Nudelman-Rikhter NR-30 autocannons (80 rounds per gun, 160 rounds total)
  - UPK-23 or SPPU-22 gun pods for 2 × Gryazev-Shipunov GSh-23L autocannons
- Hardpoints: 10 hardpoints with a capacity of up to 4,000 kg (8,800 lb) of stores, with provisions to carry combinations of:
  - Missiles: ***Air-to-air missiles:
      - K-13
      - R-60
      - R-73
    - Air-to-surface missiles:
      - Kh-23 Grom
      - Kh-25ML
      - Kh-29L/T/D
    - Anti-radiation missiles:
      - Kh-58
      - Kh-27PS
      - Kh-28
  - Bombs: drop bombs, laser-guided bombs, electro-optical bombs, napalm bombs, drag chute bombs and cluster bombs
- Rockets: S-5, S-8 & S-13

== See also ==
Related development

- Sukhoi Su-7

Aircraft of comparable role, configuration, and era

- IAR-93 Vultur
- LTV A-7 Corsair II
- Nanchang Q-5
- SEPECAT Jaguar
- Soko J-22 Orao

Related lists

- List of Iraqi aerial victories during the Iran–Iraq war
- List of Iranian aerial victories during the Iran–Iraq war
- List of military aircraft of the Soviet Union and the CIS
- List of fighter aircraft
