= Doppler (disambiguation) =

Doppler (Doppler effect or Doppler shift) is the frequency change of a wave for observer relative to its source.

It may also refer to:

- Doppler (surname), a surname and a list of people with the name
  - Christian Doppler (1803–1853), Austrian mathematician and physicist
- Doppler (building), a building in Seattle, home to Amazon.com's corporate headquarters
- Doppler (crater), a lunar impact crater
- Doppler (novel), a novel by Erlend Loe
- 3905 Doppler, an asteroid
- Doppler, the mascot of the WNBA's Seattle Storm

== See also ==
- Dr. Doppler, the villain from Mega Man X3
- Doppler beaming
- Doppler broadening
- Doppler cooling
  - Doppler cooling limit
- Doppler echocardiography
  - Doppler ultrasound, also called Doppler sonography
  - Transcranial doppler
- Doppler fetal monitor
- Doppler LIDAR
- Doppler navigation set
- Doppler radar
  - Doppler weather radar
  - Doppler on wheels (DOW)
- Doppler spectroscopy
- Doppler velocity sensor
- Laser Doppler velocimetry
- Laser Doppler vibrometer
- Photoacoustic Doppler effect
- Photon Doppler velocimetry
- Pulse-Doppler radar
- Relativistic Doppler effect
