= Doppler (surname) =

Doppler is a surname. Notable people with the surname include:

- Árpád Doppler (1857–1927), composer, son of Karl Doppler
- Christian Doppler (1803–1853), who discovered the Doppler effect
- Clemens Doppler (born 1980), beach volleyball player from Austria
- Franz Doppler (1821–1883), composer, brother of Karl Doppler
- Karl Doppler (1825–1900), composer, flute player, brother of Franz Doppler, father of Árpád Doppler
- Werner Doppler (born 1941), German agricultural and economical scientist

== Fictional characters ==
- The Doppler family from the netflix series Dark

== See also ==
- Doppler (disambiguation)
