= Doppler velocity sensor =

Radar technology

A Doppler velocity sensor (DVS) is a specialized Doppler radar that uses the Doppler effect to measure the three orthogonal velocity components referenced to the aircraft. When aircraft true heading, pitch and roll are provided by other aircraft systems, it can function as a navigation sensor to perform stand-alone dead reckoning navigation calculations as a Doppler Navigation Set (DNS).

Doppler navigation systems are independent of surrounding conditions, perform with high accuracy over land and sea anywhere in the world, and are independent of ground-based aids and space-based satellite navigation systems.

== Operational principles ==
To measure an aircraft three-dimensional velocity, a Doppler radar antenna is caused to radiate a minimum of three non-coplanar microwave electromagnetic beams toward the earth's surface. Some of the energy is backscattered to the radar by the earth surface. With knowledge of the beam angles, three or more beam-Doppler frequencies are combined to generate the components of aircraft velocity.

DVS transmission is performed at a center frequency of 13.325 GHz in the internationally authorized Ku band of 13.25 to 13.4 GHz.

== Uses ==
DVS are used on helicopters for navigation, hovering, sonar dropping, target handover for weapon delivery and search and rescue. Because the Doppler radar measures velocity relative to surface, sea current and tidal effects create biases. However, for sonobuoys dropping and over water search and rescue, velocity of the aircraft relative to water movement is expected.

These radars were formally approved under the FAA TSO-65a until 2013, and are designed in accordance with the Radio Technical Commission for Aeronautics (RTCA) DO-158 standard titled Minimum Performance Standards − Airborne Doppler Radar Navigation Equipment.

== Limitations ==
The functional operation and accuracy of Doppler velocity sensors is affected by many factors, including aircraft velocity, attitude and altitude above terrain. It is also affected by environmental factors, including the type of terrain the radar is illuminating, and precipitation in the atmosphere.

As the aircraft moves, the backscattering coefficient changes within the beam width, and this causes a shift and some skewing of the Doppler spectrum, and hence an error in the measurement of velocity. A major limitation of using DVSs for navigation is that they typically suffer from accumulated error. Because the guidance system is continually integrating velocity with respect to time to calculate position ''(see dead reckoning)'', any measurement errors, however small, are accumulated over time. This leads to 'drift': an ever-increasing difference between where the system thinks it is located and the actual location. Due to integration a constant error in velocity results in a linear error in position.

== See also ==
- Continuous wave radar
- Dead reckoning
- Frequency modulation
- Guidance systems
- Radio navigation
