= Khorol =

Khorol may refer to:

== Places ==
- Khorol, Russia, a rural locality in Primorsky Krai, Russia
  - Khorol Airfield
- Khorol, Poltava Oblast, Ukraine
  - Khorol Raion
- Khorol, Sumy Oblast, a village in Sumy Oblast, Ukraine
- Khorol (river), a river in Ukraine

== Other uses ==
- David Khorol, Jewish Soviet mathematician, aviation and rocket designer
- Khorol (game), a tile-based game played in Mongolia, Inner Mongolia, and Tuva

== See also ==
- Khorolsky (disambiguation)
