= Khorolsky (rural locality) =

Khorolsky (Russian: Хоро́льский; masculine), Khorolskaya (Хоро́льская; feminine), or Khorolskoye (Хоро́льское; neuter) is the name of several rural localities in Russia:

- Khorolsky, Saratov Oblast, a settlement in Dergachyovsky District of Saratov Oblast
- Khorolsky, Voronezh Oblast, a settlement in Khorolskoye Rural Settlement of Talovsky District of Voronezh Oblast

== See also ==
- Khorolsky (disambiguation)
- Khorol (disambiguation)
