= Ivan Tretyak =

- Иван Третьяк
- Born: 20 February 1923; Khorol Raion, Ukrainian SSR, Soviet Union
- Died: 3 May 2007 (aged 84); Moscow, Russia
- Burial place: Troyekurovskoye Cemetery
- Education: Frunze Military Academy; General Staff Military Academy
- Military career
- Allegiance: Soviet Union
- Branch: Red Army
- Rank: General of the Army
- Commands: 26th Guards Rifle Division; 4th Army; Byelorussian Military District; Far Eastern Military District; Soviet Air Defence Forces
- Conflicts: World War II

Ivan Moiseevich Tretyak (Russian: Иван Моисеевич Третьяк; Ukrainian: Іван Мойсейович Третяк; 20 February 1923 – 3 May 2007) was a Soviet general who served in various positions in the Soviet Armed Forces including as commander of the Soviet Air Defence Forces.

== History ==
Born on February 20, 1923, in the village of Malaya Popovka, Khorol district, Poltava Governorate, Ukrainian SSR in a family of Ukrainian farmers

He graduated from a seven-year school and the Poltava Agricultural College.

He was drafted into the Red Army in 1939. In 1941, he graduated from the Astrakhan rifle and machine gun school.

On the fronts of the Great Patriotic War from December 1941. He was a platoon commander in the 19th rifle brigade on the Western Front. Already in January 1942, he was seriously wounded. After recovery, he fought in the 29th Guards Rifle Division on the Western and 2nd Baltic Front, commanded a company, was deputy commander, and from July 1943 he served as a commander of a rifle battalion. Since 1943 he was a member of the Communist Party of the Soviet Union

In the summer of 1944, the division commander, Major General Andrei Stuchenko, gave the Tretyak the combat mission of leading an advance detachment together with a tank battalion. Following the order, the tank crews and infantrymen drove into the German rear in vehicles and secretly reached the Velikaya River along forest roads. A ford was found, along which the detachment successfully crossed and, with a final night dash, reached the outskirts of the city of Opochka. The appearance of tanks with troops on their armour was a complete surprise for the German garrison, and panic arose. With daring actions, the soldiers captured the city, inflicting heavy losses on the enemy. The city was held until the main forces arrived. Ivan Tretyak was nominated for the title of Hero.

By the Decree of the Presidium of the Supreme Soviet of the Soviet Union of March 24, 1945, for exemplary performance of combat missions of the command on the front of the fight against the German invaders and the courage and heroism displayed in doing so, Guards Major Tretyak was awarded the title of Hero of the Soviet Union with the presentation of the Order of Lenin and the Gold Star medal.

From August 1944, at the age of 21, he commanded the 93rd Guards Rifle Regiment of the 29th Guards Rifle Division. He particularly distinguished himself during the crossing of the Velikaya River and the liberation of the city of Opochka in the Pskov Oblast. He took part in the blockade of the Courland group of German troops. In November 1944, he was seriously wounded for the third time, and after the hospital he returned to duty only in March 1945.

After the end of the Great Patriotic War, he continued to serve in the Soviet Army. In 1946, regiment commander Tretyak entered the academy. He graduated from the Frunze Military Academy. Then he served as deputy head of the combat training department of the 11th Guards Army in the Baltic Military District, commander of the 75th Guards Motor Rifle Regiment of the 26th Guards East Siberian Gorodok Red Banner Order of Suvorov Motor Rifle Division.

From April 15, 1956, to October 19, 1957, he commanded the 26th Guards Rifle Division.

He graduated from the Military Academy of the General Staff of the Soviet Armed Forces in 1959.

From January 1960 he served as Chief of Staff and First Deputy Commander of the 3rd Combined Arms Army in the Group of Soviet Forces in Germany.

From December 1964 to September 1967 he served as Commander of the 4th Army of the Transcaucasian Military District. In 1967-1976 he served as Commander of the troops of the Belarusian Military District, in 1976 he refused the appointment of his deputy for logistics proposed by the Minister of Defense.

In 1976-1984 — Commander of the troops of the Far Eastern Military District. On September 1, 1983, he received an order from the Chief of the Main Operations Directorate and First Deputy Chief of the General Staff of the Soviet Armed Forces Valentin Varennikov to destroy a passenger Boeing 747 plane of the South Korean airline Korean Air, which violated Soviet airspace, and carried it out, giving orders to his subordinates to destroy the aircraft. As a result of the incident, 246 passengers and 23 crew members died.

From June 19, 1984, to July 11, 1986, he served as Commander-in-Chief of the Far East Troops. From July 12, 1986, to June 11, 1987, he served as Deputy Minister of Defense of the Soviet Union and Chief Inspector of the Soviet Ministry of Defense. From June 11, 1987, to August 31, 1991, he served as Deputy Minister of Defense of the Soviet Union and Commander-in-Chief of the Soviet Air Defence Forces. He was removed from office on August 31, 1991, immediately after the 1991 Soviet coup attempt.

He was a candidate (alternate) member of the Central Committee (1971–1976) and a full member of the Central Committee from 1976 to 1990. He was also a deputy of the Supreme Soviet of the Soviet Union of the 8th-11th convocations (1970–1989).

He retired in November 1991 and died on May 3, 2007. He was buried at Troyekurovskoye Cemetery in Moscow.

== Awards ==
- Hero of the Soviet Union (24.03.1945);
- Hero of Socialist Labour (16.02.1982);
- Order "For Merit to the Fatherland" IV degree (23.02.2003);
- four Order of Lenin (24.03.1945, 04.05.1972, 21.02.1978, 16.02.1982);
- three Order of the Red Banner (15.07.1944, 14.10.1944, 22.02.1968);
- Order of Kutuzov III degree (29.09.1943);
- Order of Alexander Nevsky (20.03.1945);
- Order of the Patriotic War I degree (11.03.1985);
- two Order of the Red Star (05.07.1943, 1954);
- Order "For Service to the Homeland in the Armed Forces of the USSR" 2nd class (22.02.1989);
- Order "For Service to the Homeland in the Armed Forces of the USSR" 3rd class (30.04.1975);
- Soviet medals;
- Honorary Citizen of the city of Khabarovsk;
- Honorary Citizen of the city of Opochka, Pskov Oblast;
- Three foreign orders;
- Medals of the Mongolian People's Republic and a number of other countries.
