= Khorolsky =

Khorolsky (masculine), Khorolskaya (feminine), or Khorolskoye (neuter) may refer to:

- Khorolsky District, a district of Primorsky Krai, Russia
- Khorol Raion, a district of Poltava Oblast, Ukraine
- Khorolsky (rural locality), several places in Russia

== See also ==
- Khorol (disambiguation)
