= Tupolev Tu-95 =

Russian strategic bomber aircraft

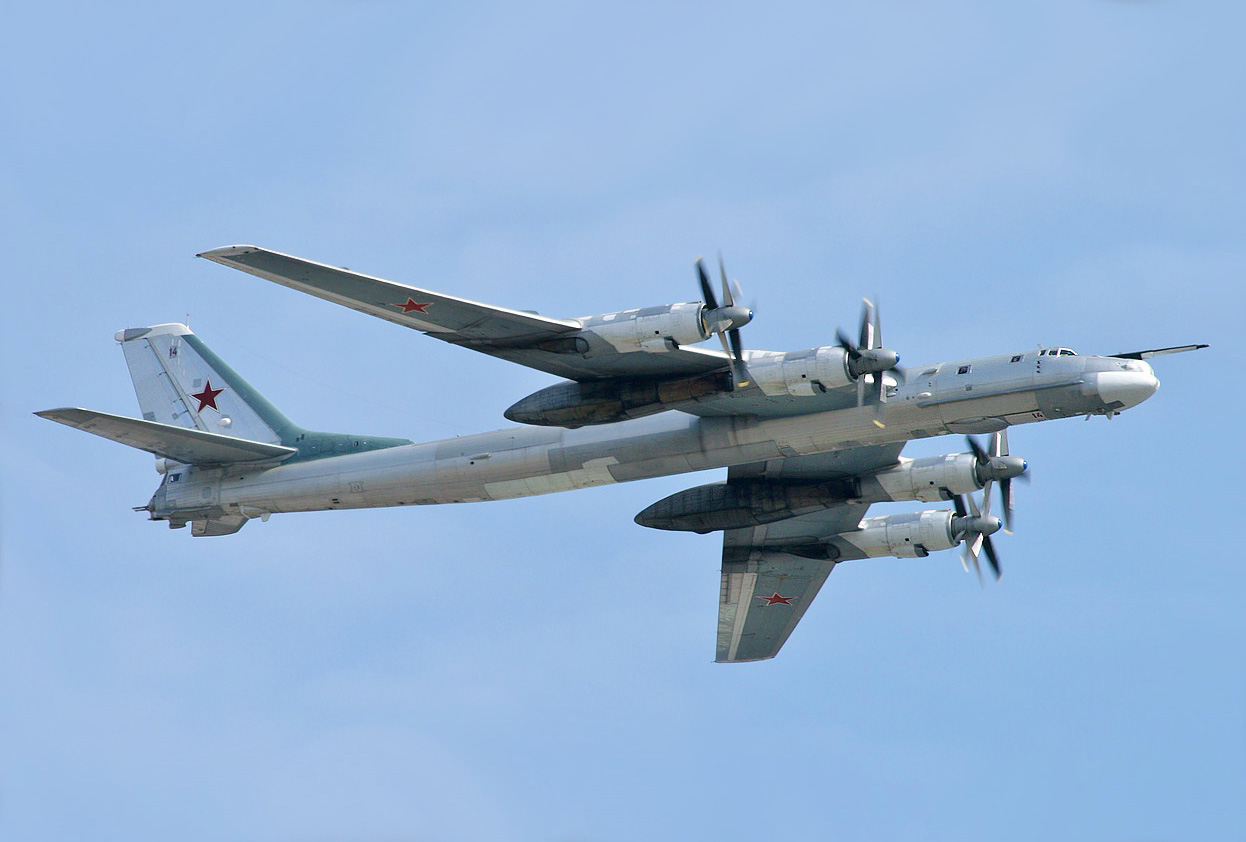
- A Tu-95MS flying over Moscow, 2008.

General information
- Type: Strategic heavy nuclear bomber
- National origin: Soviet Union
- Manufacturer: Aviakor
- Designer: Tupolev
- Status: In service
- Primary users: Russian Aerospace Forces Soviet Air Forces (historical); Soviet Navy (historical); Ukrainian Air Force (historical)
- Number built: >500

History
- Manufactured: 1952–1993
- Introduction date: 1956
- First flight: 12 November 1952; 73 years ago
- Variants: Tupolev Tu-114; Tupolev Tu-142; Tupolev Tu-95LAL; Tupolev Tu-116

The Tupolev Tu-95 (Russian: Туполев Ту-95; NATO reporting name: "Bear") is a large Soviet nuclear-capable, four-engine turboprop strategic bomber and missile launch platform. First flown in 1952, the Tu-95 entered service with the Long-Range Aviation of the Soviet Air Forces in 1956 and was first used in combat in 2015. It is expected to serve the Russian Aerospace Forces until at least 2040.

A development of the bomber for maritime patrol is designated the Tu-142, while a passenger airliner derivative was called the Tu-114.

The aircraft has four Kuznetsov NK-12 engines with contra-rotating propellers. It is the only turboprop-powered strategic bomber still in operational use. The Tu-95 is one of the loudest military aircraft, particularly because the tips of the propeller blades are supersonic. The Tu-95 is the only propeller-driven aircraft with swept wings built in large numbers. Its armament has included the Kh-55 nuclear-armed cruise missile and Kh-101 stealth cruise missile.

Soviet crews carried out long-range patrols, without nuclear weapons, until 1991. Russia resumed similar patrols from 2007. In the 1950s and 1960s, experimental variants were used for air-dropped Soviet nuclear tests, including the Tsar Bomba, and for researching nuclear-powered aircraft.

In 1981, the Tu-95MS modernized variant began production. Following the dissolution of the Soviet Union, the Ukrainian Air Force inherited 23 to 29 Tu-95s. Under the Nunn–Lugar Cooperative Threat Reduction program, these were dismantled by 2001.

The bomber was first used in combat in November 2015 at the outset of Russian intervention in the Syrian civil war. It has been used for cruise missile attacks in the Russo-Ukrainian war since 2022. Ukraine's Operation Spiderweb drone attack destroyed 7 to 8 of Russia's Tu-95MSs at Belaya and Olenya airbases on 1 June 2025.

== Design and development ==
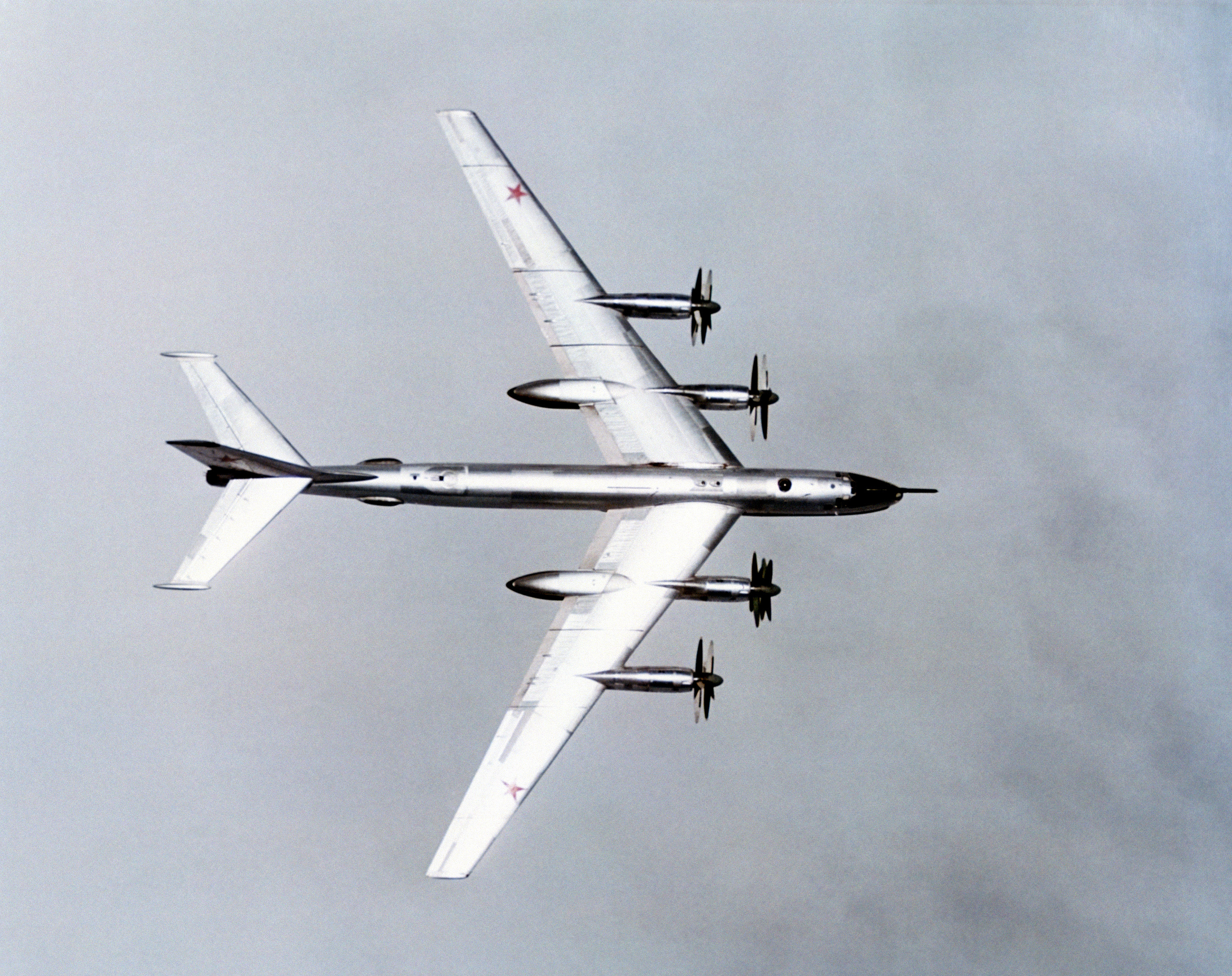
Top view of a Tu-95 showing its swept wing and anti-shock bodies

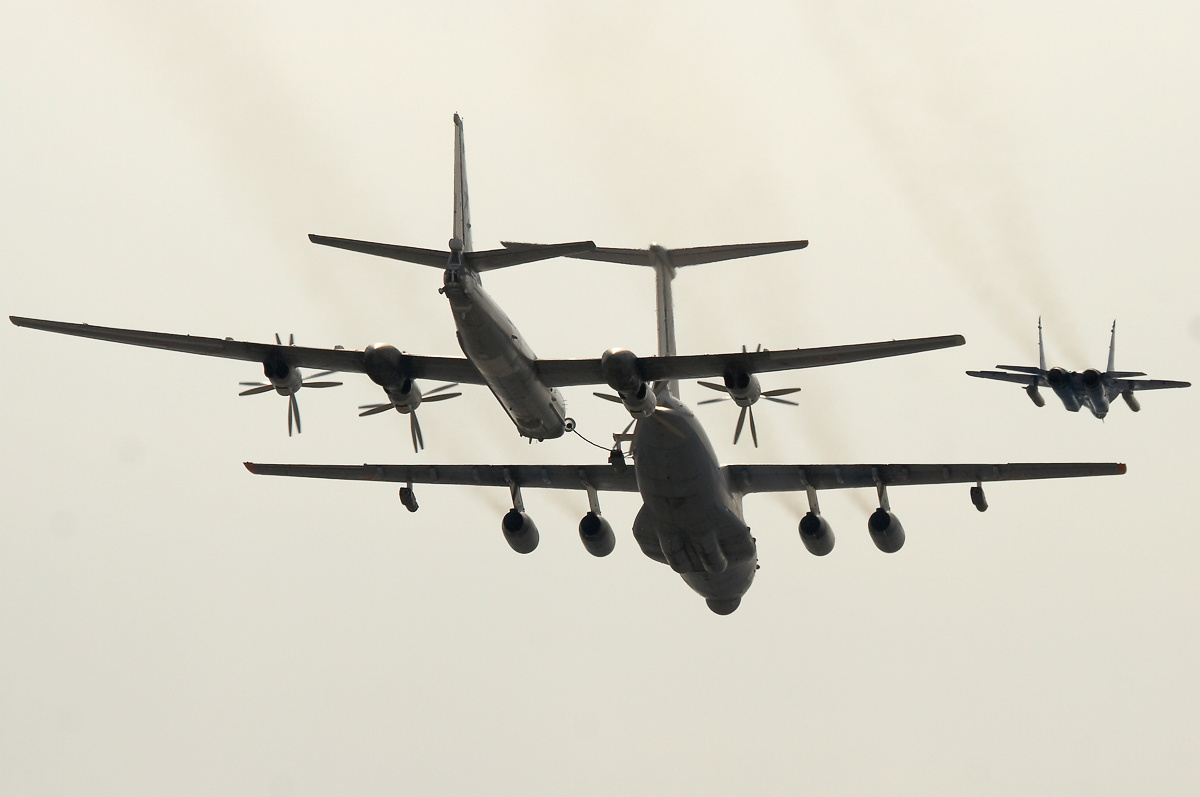
A Tu-95MS simulating aerial refueling with an Ilyushin Il-78 during the Victory Day Parade in Moscow on 9 May 2008

The design bureau, led by Andrei Tupolev, designed the Soviet Union's first intercontinental bomber, the 1949 Tu-85, a scaled-up version of the Tu-4, a Boeing B-29 Superfortress copy. A new requirement was issued to both Tupolev and Myasishchev design bureaus in 1950: the proposed bomber had to have an un-refueled range of 8,000 km (5,000 mi), far enough to threaten key targets in the United States. Other goals included the ability to carry an 11,000 kg (24,000 lb) load over the target.

Tupolev was faced with selecting a suitable type of powerplant: the Tu-4 showed that piston engines were not powerful enough for such a large aircraft, and the AM-3 jet engines for the proposed T-4 intercontinental jet bomber used too much fuel to give the required range. Turboprop engines were more powerful than piston engines and gave better range than the turbojets available at the time, and gave a top speed between the two. Turboprops were also initially selected for the Boeing B-52 Stratofortress to meet its long range requirement, and for the British long-range transport aircraft, the Saunders-Roe Princess, the Bristol Brabazon Mk 2 and the Bristol Britannia.

Tupolev proposed a turboprop installation and a Tu-95 design with this configuration was officially approved by the government on 11 July 1951. It used four Kuznetsov coupled turboprops, each fitted with two contra-rotating propellers with four blades each, with a nominal 8,900 kW (12,000 hp) power rating. The engine, advanced for its time, was designed by a German team of ex-Junkers prisoner-engineers under Ferdinand Brandner. The fuselage was conventional with a mid-mounted wing with 35 degrees of sweep, an angle that ensured that the main wing spar passed through the fuselage in front of the bomb bay. Retractable tricycle landing gear was fitted, with all three gear strut units retracting rearwards, with the main gear units retracting rearwards into extensions of the inner engine nacelles.

The Tu-95/I, with 2TV-2F engines, first flew in November 1952 with test pilot Alexey Perelet at the controls. After six months of test flights this aircraft suffered a propeller gearbox failure and crashed, killing Perelet. The second aircraft, Tu-95/II, used four 12,000 eshp Kuznetsov NK-12 turboprops which proved more reliable than the coupled 2TV-2F. After a successful flight testing phase, series production of the Tu-95 started in January 1956.

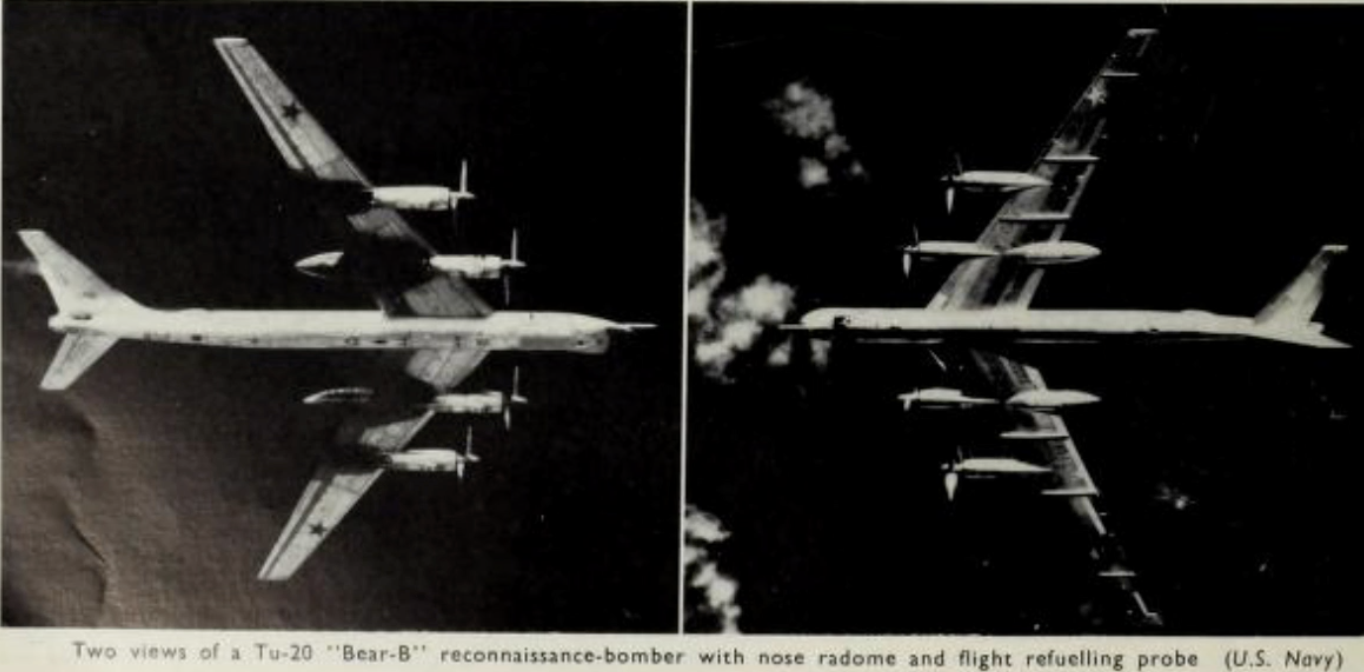
Tu-20/Tu-95 "Bear-B" reconnaissance-bomber, showing its nose radome and flight refuelling probe

For a long time, the Tu-95 was known to U.S./NATO intelligence as the Tu-20. While this was the original Soviet Air Force designation for the aircraft, by the time it was being supplied to operational units it was already better known under the Tu-95 designation used internally by Tupolev, and the Tu-20 designation quickly fell out of use in the USSR. Since the Tu-20 designation was used on many documents acquired by U.S. intelligence agents, the name continued to be used outside the Soviet Union. Initially, the United States Department of Defense evaluated the Tu-95 as having a maximum speed of 640 km/h (400 mph) with a range of 12,500 km (7,800 mi). These numbers had to be revised upward numerous times.

Like its American counterpart, the B-52, the Tu-95 has continued to operate in the Russian Aerospace Forces while several subsequent iterations of bomber design have come and gone. Part of the reason for this longevity was its suitability, like the B-52, for modification to different missions. Whereas the Tu-95 was originally intended to drop free-falling nuclear weapons, it was subsequently modified to perform a wide range of roles, such as the deployment of cruise missiles, maritime patrol (Tu-142), and even civilian airliner (Tu-114). An AWACS platform (Tu-126) was developed from the Tu-114. An icon of the Cold War, the Tu-95 has served not only as a weapons platform but as a symbol of Soviet and later Russian national prestige. Russia's air force has received the first examples of a number of modernised strategic bombers in Tu-95MSs following upgrade work. Enhancements have been confined to the bomber's electronic weapons and targeting systems. Modernization of the first batch was completed in March 2020.

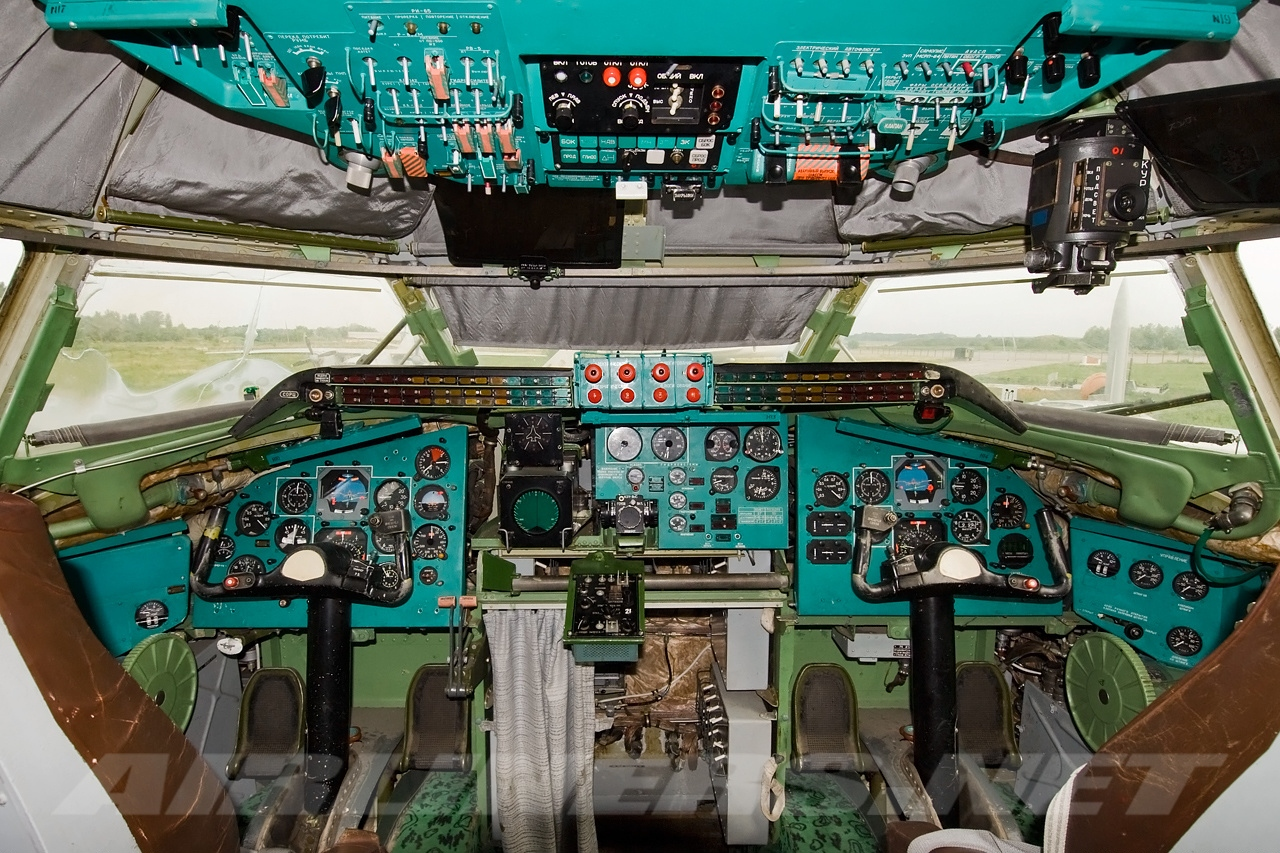
Tu-95MS cockpit

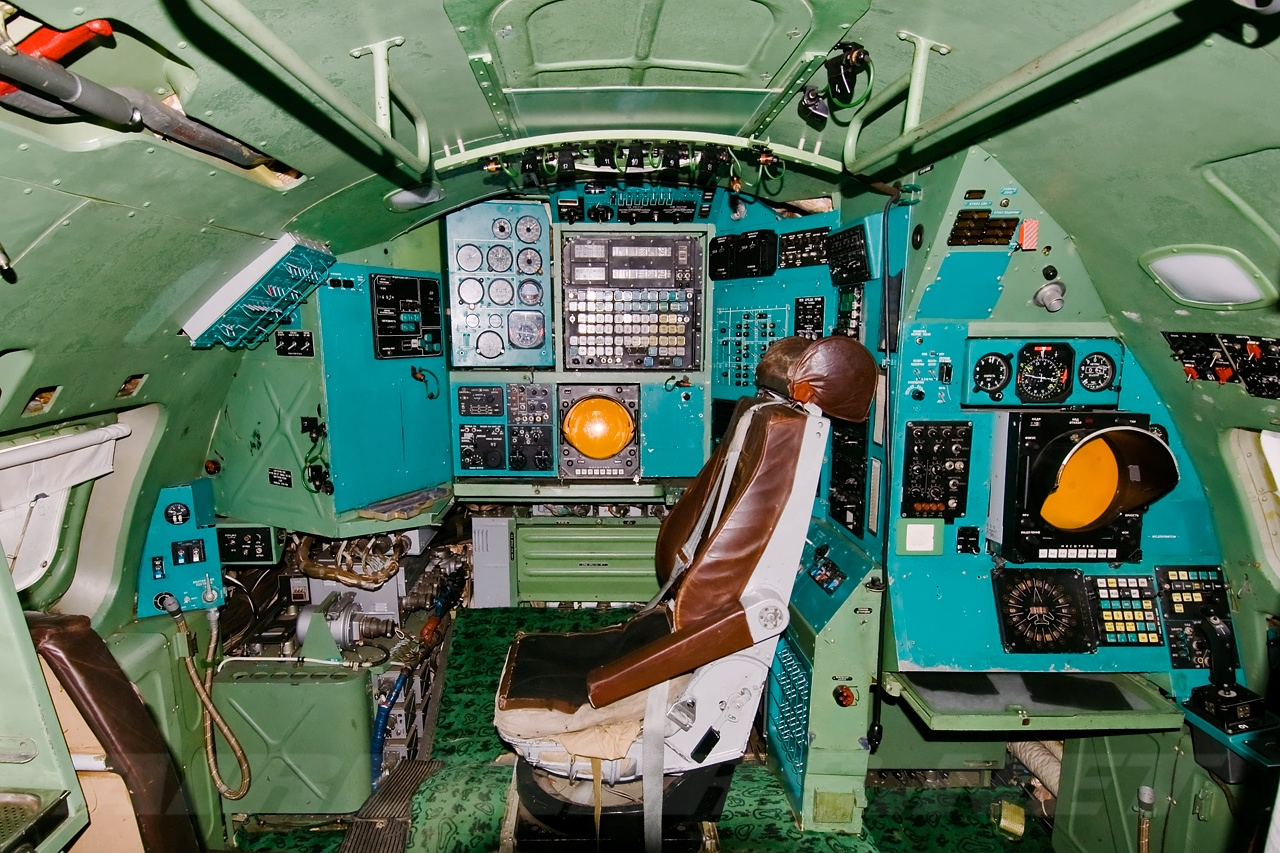
Navigator position

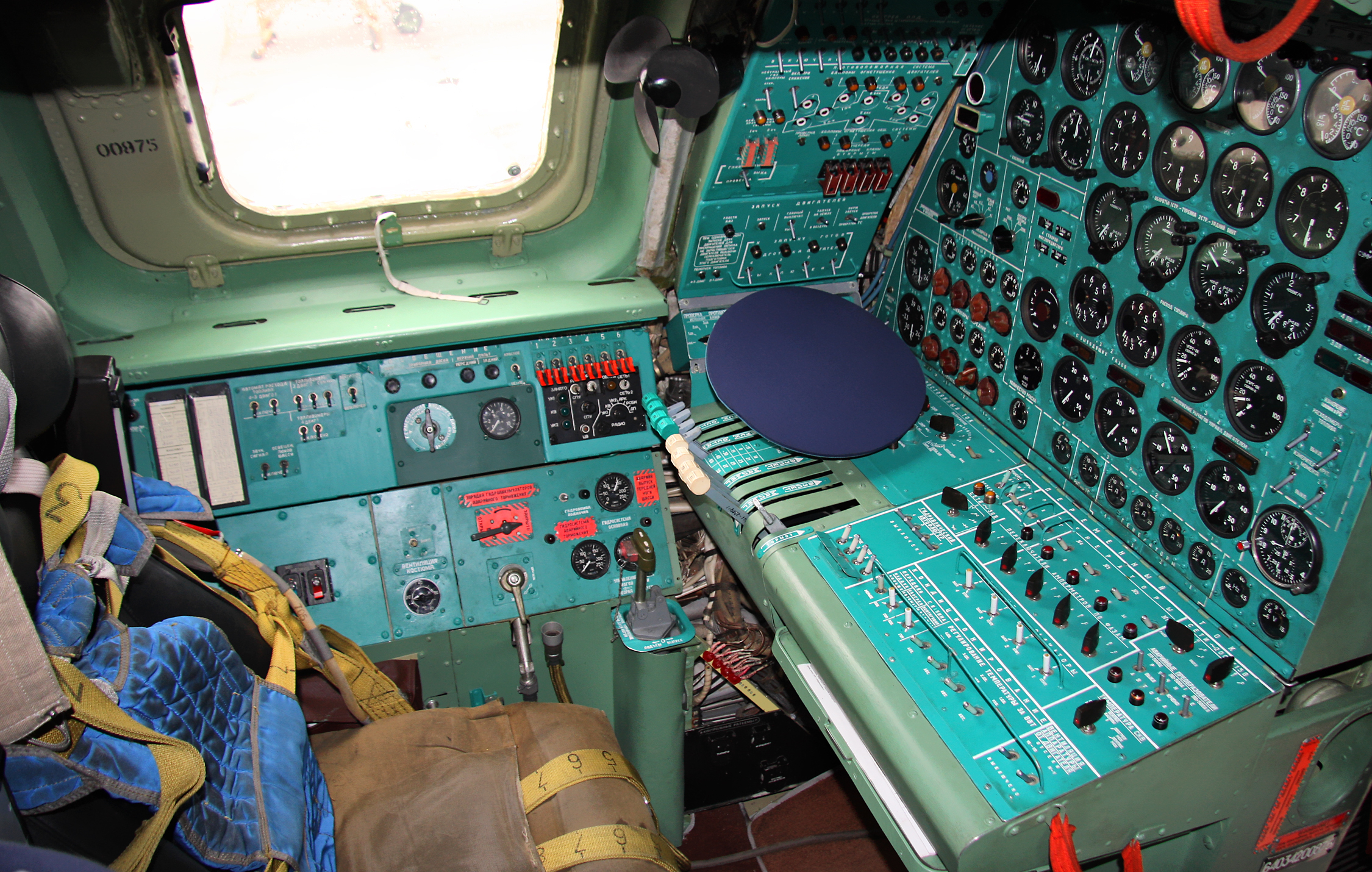
Flight engineer position

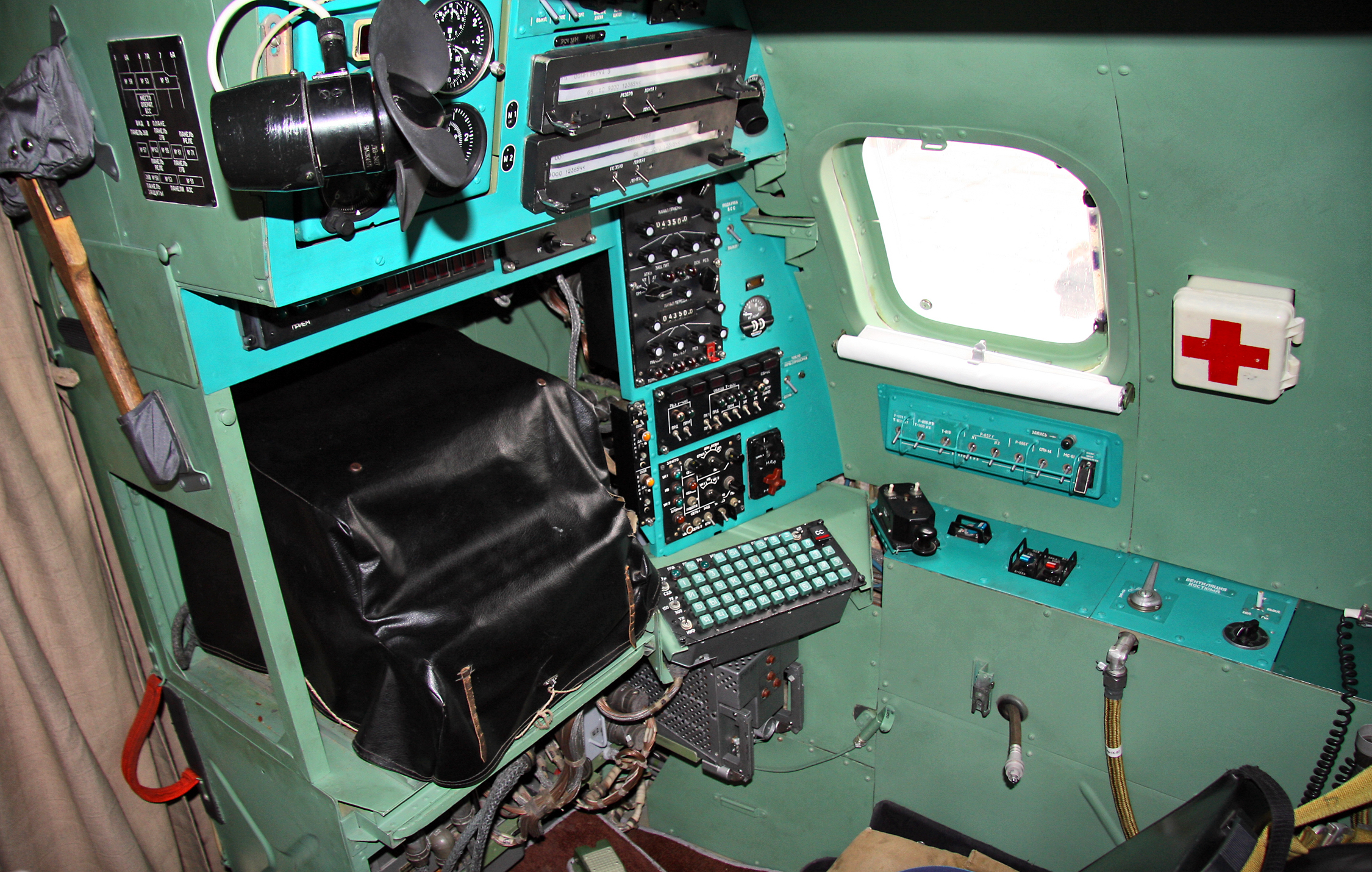
Radio operator position

=== Tu-116 ===
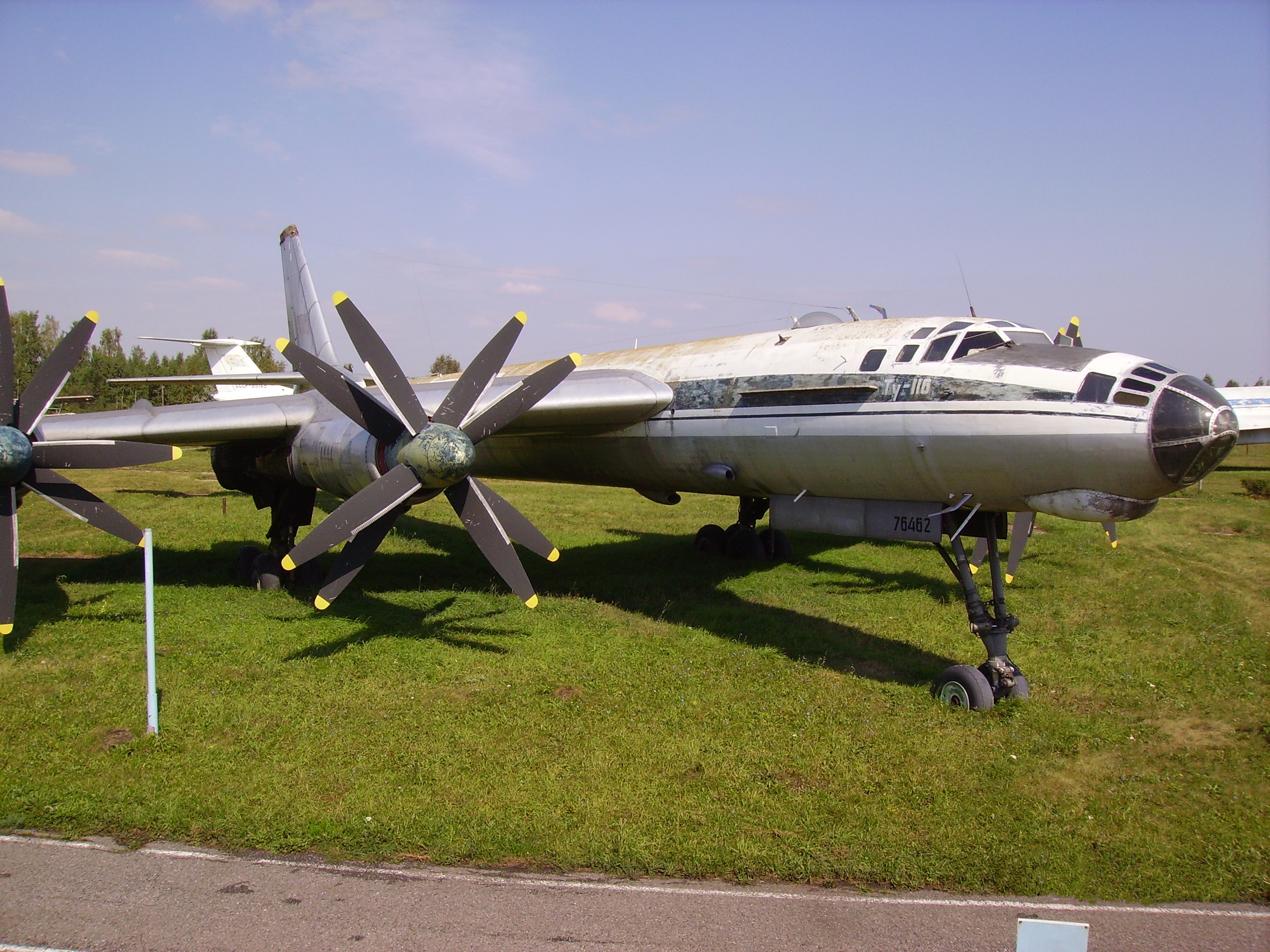
A Tu-116 preserved at Ulyanovsk Aircraft Museum

Designed as a stopgap in case the Tu-114A was not finished on time, two Tu-95 bombers were fitted with passenger compartments. Both aircraft had the same layout: office space, a passenger cabin consisting of two sections which could each accommodate 20 people in VIP seating, and the rest of the 70 m^{3} (2,500 ft^{3}) cabin configured as a normal airliner. Both aircraft were eventually used as crew ferries by the various Tu-95 squadrons. One of these machines is preserved at Ulyanovsk Central Airport.

=== Modernization ===
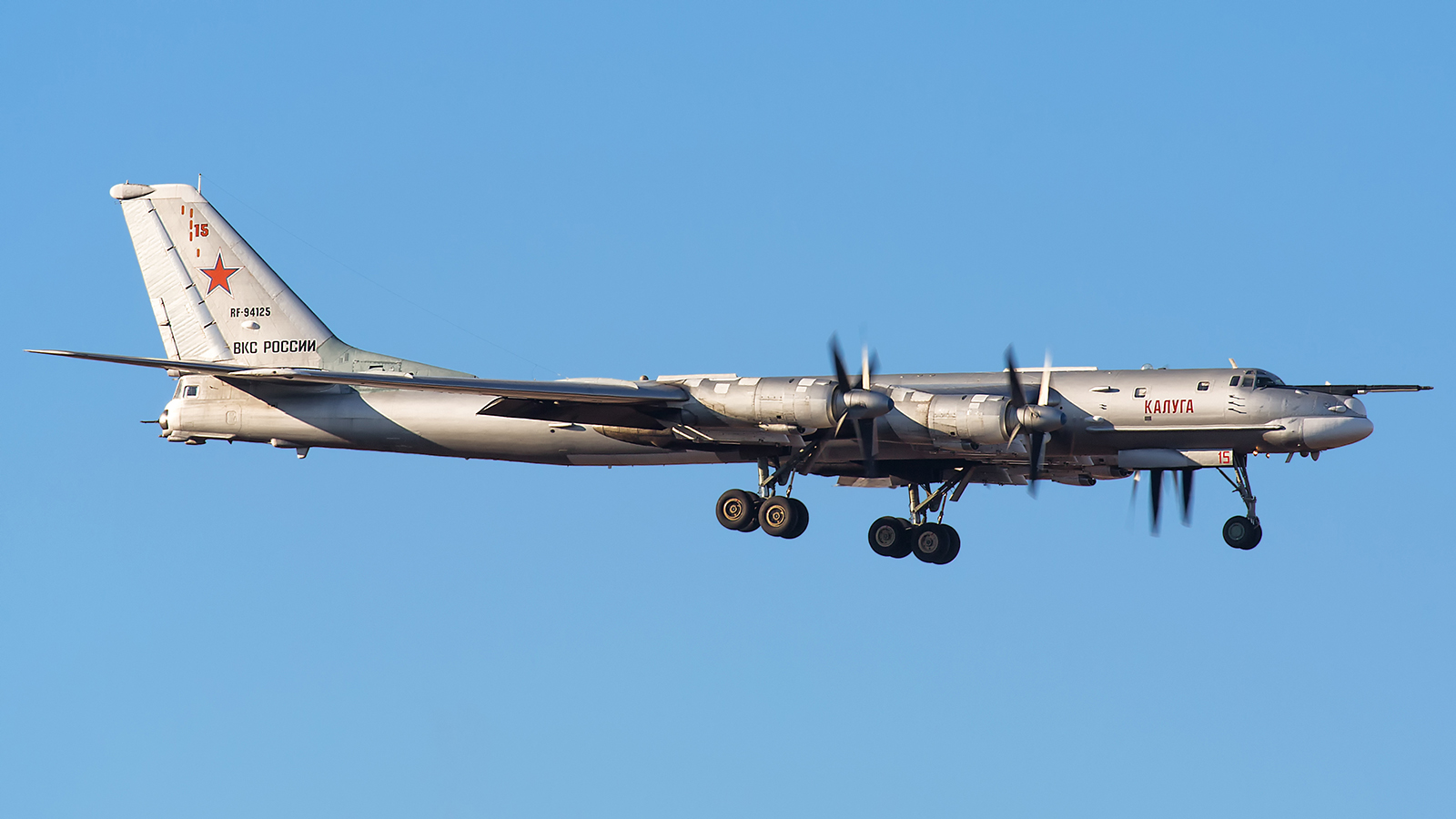
Tu-95MSM Kaluga, named after one of the oldest Russian cities

Starting in the 2000s, the Russian Air Force started to study different options for the modernisation of its Tu-95MS fleet. Even before the start of the modernisation program, in 2003 the aircraft were made compatible with the Kh-555 missile. Then, the proper modernisation program was initiated. Development officially started when a research and development contract was issued to Tupolev by the Russian Defence Ministry, on 23 December 2009. The modernisations are applied to only the Tu-95MS16s using the K-016 Sprut missile initialisation system, and not to the aircraft using the older K-012 Osina (the K-016 allows the use of longer-ranged Kh-55SM missiles); in other words, only the aircraft manufactured from 1986 onwards are modernised. In total, this represents a fleet of between 30 and 35 aircraft. The program is divided into two steps: the first one consists of making the aircraft compatible with Kh-101/102 cruise missiles. These are too big to fit in the internal missile bay; hence, new external hardpoints are added. A total of eight Kh-101/102s can be carried under four double missile pylons, in addition to six Kh-55/55SM/555s in the internal rotary missile launcher. Several pieces of equipment are also replaced in this first step of the modernisation, including the satellite signal reception system, the instrument landing system, and other navigation systems. The first Tu-95 modernized to carry the Kh-101/102 missiles was the Tu-95MS Saratov, rolled out at the Beriev aircraft plant in Taganrog in early 2015. It was transferred to the Russian Air Force in March 2015. Since 2015, the serial modernisation is carried out also by the Aviakor aircraft plant in Samara at a rate of three aircraft per year. The first Tu-95 modernized by Aviakor was the Tu-95MS Dubna, transferred to the Russian Aerospace Forces on 18 November 2015. In the future, Tu-95MSs are to be upgraded with the SVP-24 sighting and computing system from the Russian company Gefest & T.

The second step of the modernisation program is also the most extensive one, and is known as Tu-95MSM. It includes the installation of the new Novella NV1.021 passive electronically scanned array radar instead of the current Obzor-MS, a new S021 navigation system and the Meteor-NM2 airborne defense complex. In addition, the aircraft modernized to the "MSM" variant will be equipped with upgraded Kuznetsov NK-12MPM turboprop engines, together with new AV-60T propellers, reducing the vibration level by 50%. Lastly, the tail turret has been removed. The first Tu-95MSM made its maiden flight on 22 August 2020. A new contract on upgrading Tu-95MS strategic missile-carrying bombers to the Tu-95MSM level was signed in August 2021.

== Operational history ==
=== Soviet Union ===
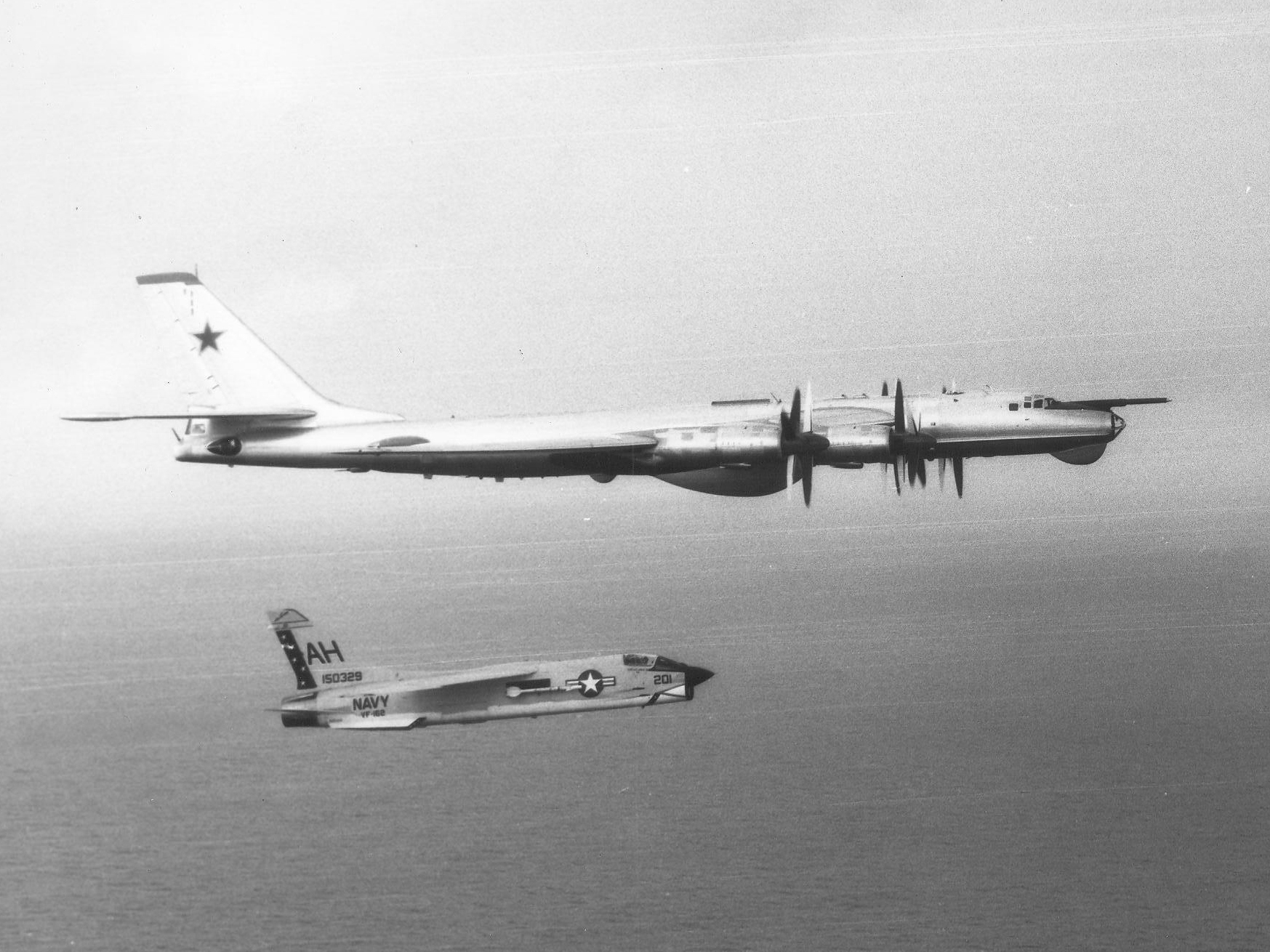
A Tu-95RTs "Bear-D" escorted by a U.S. Navy F-8E Crusader, c. 1966-1968.

The Tu-95RTs variant in particular was a veritable icon of the Cold War as it performed a maritime surveillance and targeting mission for other aircraft, surface ships and submarines. It was identifiable by a large bulge under the fuselage, which reportedly housed a radar antenna that was used to search for and detect surface ships.

A series of nuclear surface tests were carried out by the Soviet Union in the early- to mid-1960s. On 30 October 1961, a modified Tu-95 carried and dropped the AN602 device named "Tsar Bomba", the most powerful thermonuclear device ever detonated. Video footage of that particular test exists since the event was filmed for documentation purposes. The footage shows the specially adapted Tu-95V plane – painted with anti-flash white on its ventral surfaces – taking off carrying the bomb, in-flight scenes of the interior and exterior of the aircraft, and the detonation. The bomb was attached underneath the aircraft, which carried the weapon semi-externally since it could not be carried inside a standard Tu-95's bomb bay, similar to the way the B.1 Special version of the Avro Lancaster did with the ten-tonne Grand Slam "earthquake bomb". Along with the Tsar Bomba, the Tu-95 proved to be a versatile bomber that would deliver the RDS-4 Tatyana (a fission bomb with a yield of forty-two kilotons), RDS-6S thermonuclear bomb, the RDS-37 2.9-megaton thermonuclear bomb, and the RP-30-32 200-kiloton bomb.

The early versions of the bomber omitted crew amenities, with dank and dingy interiors lacking a toilet or a galley. Though flying the Tu-95 was uncomfortable, especially during the routine 10-hour mission trips twice a week, constant training ensured a high degree of combat readiness and around 1,200 flight-hours annually.

Due to the nature of their mission, Tu-95 bomber crews were often some of the best available in the Soviet Air Force. As part of their nuclear strike mission, bomber crews would undertake frequent missions into the Arctic to practice transpolar strikes against the United States. Unlike their American counterparts, however, Tu-95 aircraft did not fly missions carrying "live" nuclear weapons. This practice, a result of live ammunition being housed in special bunkers on the bases and a lengthy loading process (done via servicing trench below the bomb bay and taking up to two hours) was seen as a hindrance to overall mission readiness.

During the Falklands War Tu-95s carried out intelligence-gathering flights around Ascension Island.

=== Russia ===
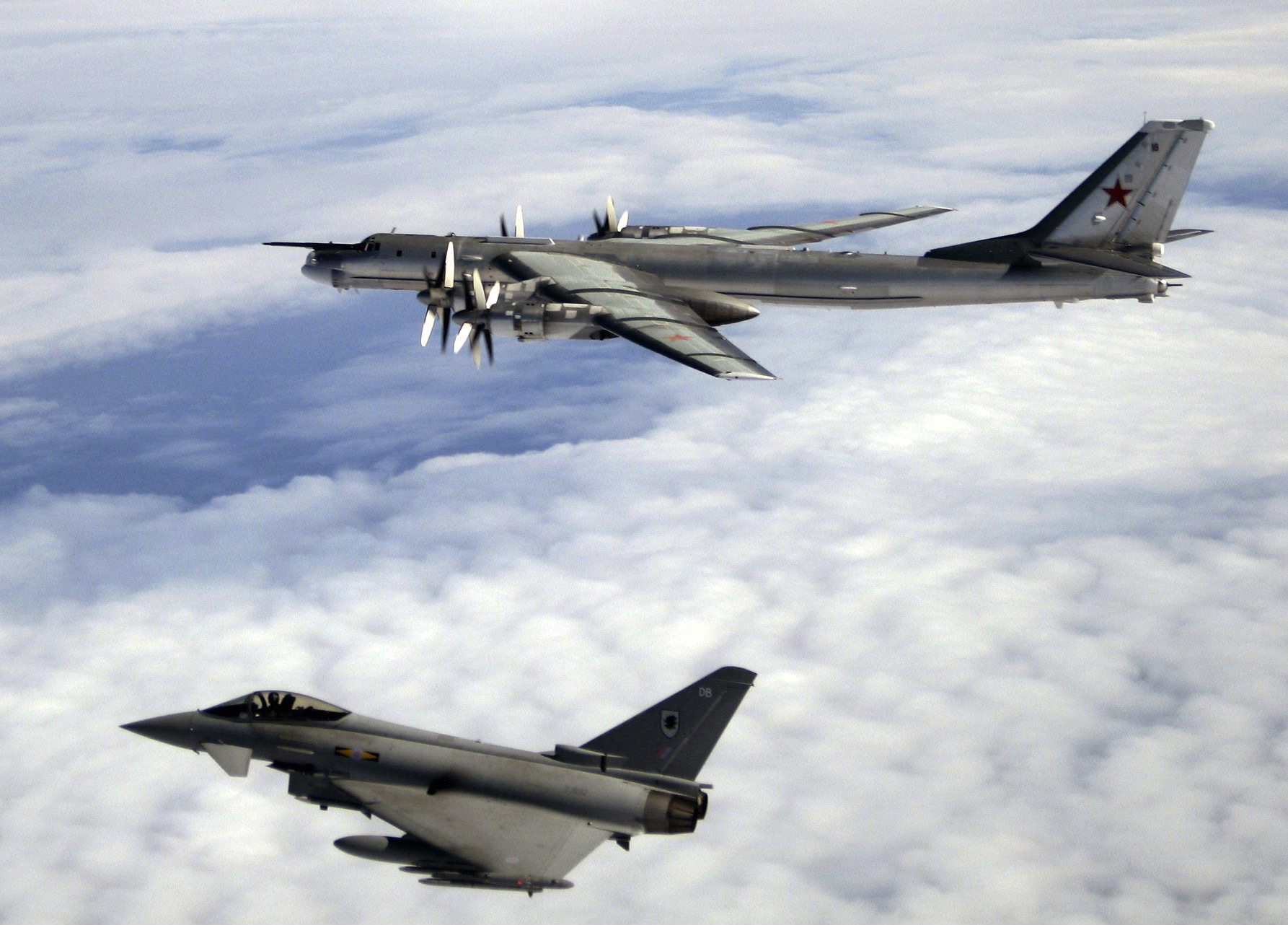
A Tu-95MS "Bear-H" escorted by an RAF Eurofighter Typhoon F.2 in 2008 over North Atlantic

In 1992, newly independent Kazakhstan began returning the Tu-95 aircraft of the 79th Heavy Bomber Aviation Division at Dolon air base to the Russian Federation. The bombers joined those already at the Far Eastern Ukrainka air base.

On 17 August 2007, Russian President Vladimir Putin announced that Russia was resuming strategic aviation flights by sending its bombers on long-range patrols, a practice that had ended with the breakup of the Soviet Union in 1991. Fighters from NATO members are often sent to intercept and escort Tu-95s as they perform their missions along the periphery of NATO airspace, often close to each other.

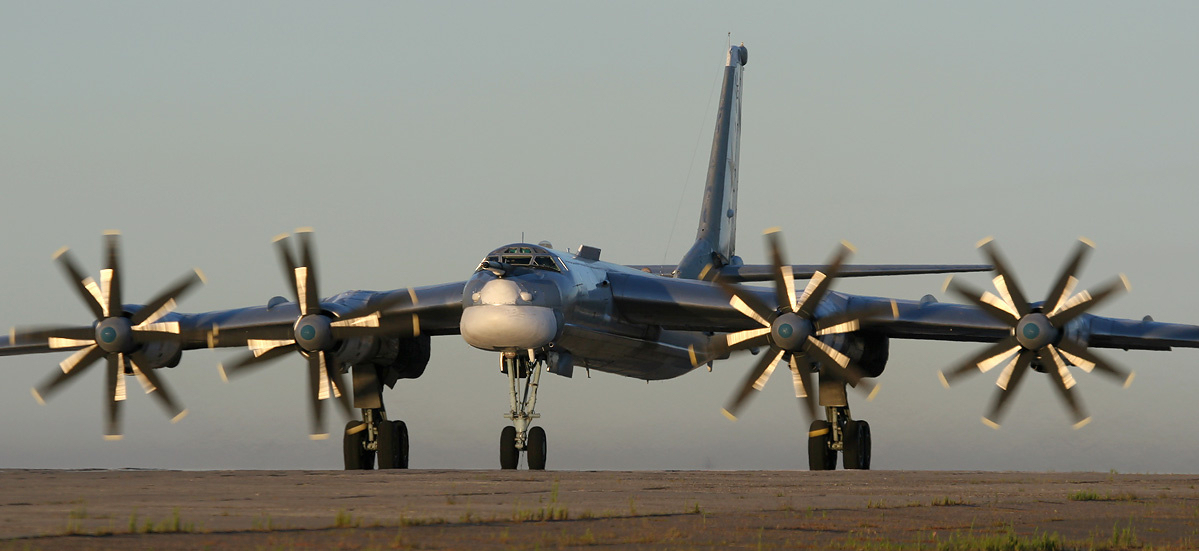
Tu-95MS at Engels Air Force Base, 2006

Russian Tu-95s reportedly took part in a naval exercise off the coasts of France and Spain in January 2008, alongside Tupolev Tu-22M3 "Backfire" strategic bombers and Beriev A-50 "Mainstay" airborne early-warning aircraft.

During the Russian Stability 2008 military exercise in October 2008, Tu-95MS aircraft fired live air-launched cruise missiles for the first time since 1984. The long range of the Kh-55 cruise missile means the Tu-95MS can once again serve as a strategic weapons system.

In July 2010, two Russian Tu-95MS set a world record for a non-stop flight for an aircraft in the class, spending more than 43 hours in the air. They flew through the Atlantic, Arctic, and Pacific oceans as well as the Sea of Japan, covering in total more than 30,000 km (19,000 mi) with four mid-air refuelings. The primary goal of the endurance flight was to evaluate the performance of the aircraft during such a long flight, in particular monitoring the engines and other systems.

On 17 November 2015, Tu-95s had their combat debut, being employed for the first time in long-range airstrikes as part of the Russian military intervention in the Syrian Civil War. On 17 November 2016, Tu-95MSs performed their first combat deployment, launching the Kh-101 cruise missiles on several militant positions in Syria.

On 5 December 2017, two Tu-95MSs and two Il-76MD transport aircraft landed for the first time at the Biak Air Base in Indonesia. The bombers covered more than 7,000 km (4,300 mi) with aerial refueling before landing at the air base. During the course of their visit, the Tu-95 crews conducted their first patrol flights over the southern Pacific, staying airborne for more than eight hours.

From 2019, Tu-95MSs began carrying out joint patrols with People's Liberation Army Air Force Xi'an H-6 bombers. As of 2025, ten such joint flights have occurred, resulting in interceptions by South Korean, Japanese, and US fighter aircraft.

Tu-95MS/MSM bombers reportedly took part in the opening assault on Ukraine during the initial phase of the 2022 Russian invasion of Ukraine on 24 February 2022. On 6 March 2022, according to Ukrainian sources, Tu-95MS and Tu-160 strategic bombers launched eight cruise missiles, presumably the Kh-101, at the Havryshivka Vinnytsia International Airport from the Black Sea area. On 26 June 2022, spokesman of the Ukrainian Air Force Yurii Ihnat reported four to six Kh-101 cruise missiles were launched by Tu-95MS and Tu-160s at Kyiv from the Caspian Sea area. The bombers reportedly flew from Astrakhan.

On 5 December 2022, explosions were reported at two Russian airbases: the one at Engels-2 reportedly damaged two Tu-95s. Subsequently on 6 December satellite photos show that one Tu-95MS "Bear-H" had caught fire and had to be covered in foam. A Tu-22M was also damaged. The attack was carried out by modernised Tu-141 drones.

On 1 June 2025, Ukraine's Operation Spider's Web destroyed four Tu-95 bombers at Olenya airbase and three or four Tu-95 bombers at Belaya air base.

On 17 July 2026, a Ukrainian drone strike on the Engels-2 air base, by the SBU, destroyed a Tu-95. A second Tu-95 at the base was destroyed by another drone attack on 28 August.

== Incidents and accidents ==
- On 3 September 1971, a Tu-95RT crashed west of Vologda, killing all 11 occupants.
- On 8 June 2015, a Tu-95 engine caught fire while taking off from the Ukrainka airbase in Amur Oblast. The aircraft veered off the runway and two crew members were killed.
- On 14 July 2015, a Tu-95MS aircraft crashed while performing a scheduled training flight some 80 km (50 mi) from Khabarovsk, killing two crew members.
- On 29 September 2026, a Tu-95MS crashed in the Amur region, killing all eight crew onboard. Three of the dead, Major Andrei Lobanov, Major Andrei Gerasimov and Lieutenant Colonel Fyodor Pavlyukov, are listed by Ukrainian analysts as “participants in or organizers of missile strikes” against Ukraine.

== Variants ==
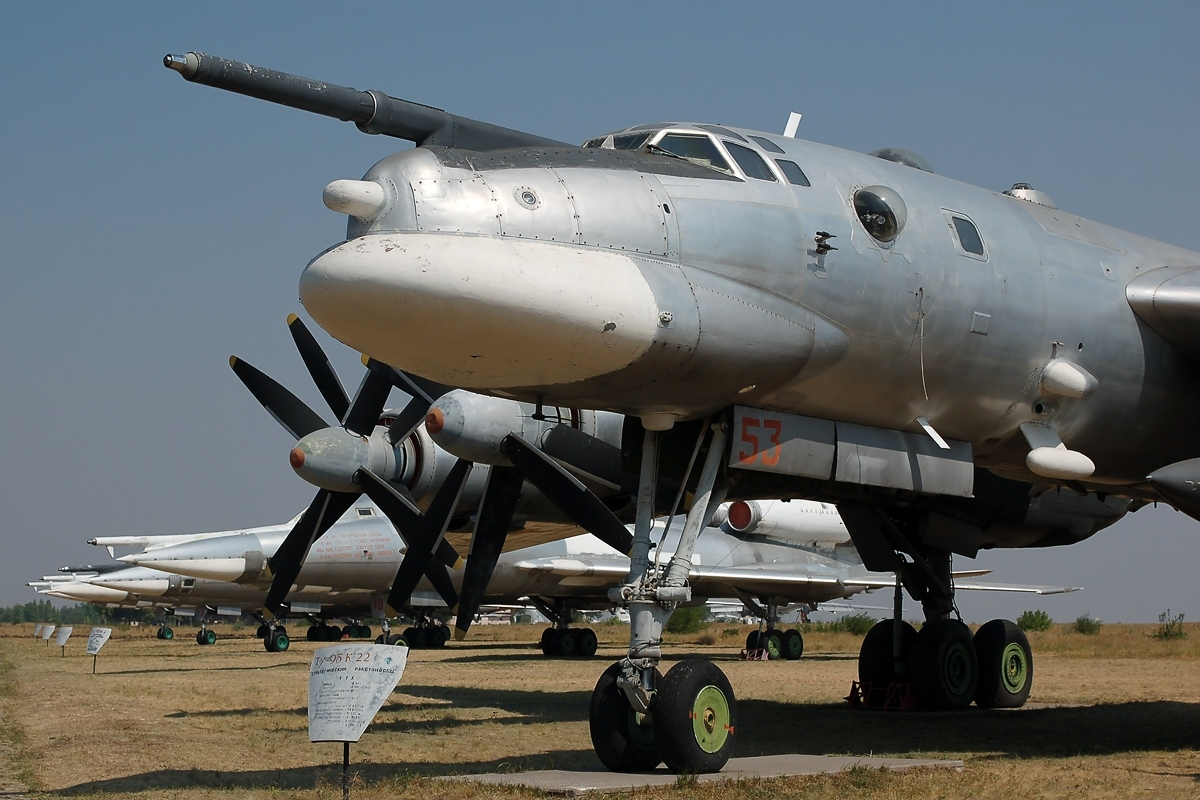
Tu-95K22 "Bear-G" with a large radome for guiding Kh-22 missiles

A Tu-95 performs a fly-over with an Il-78 and two MiG-29s simulating aerial refueling at the Victory Day Parade in Moscow on 9 May 2008

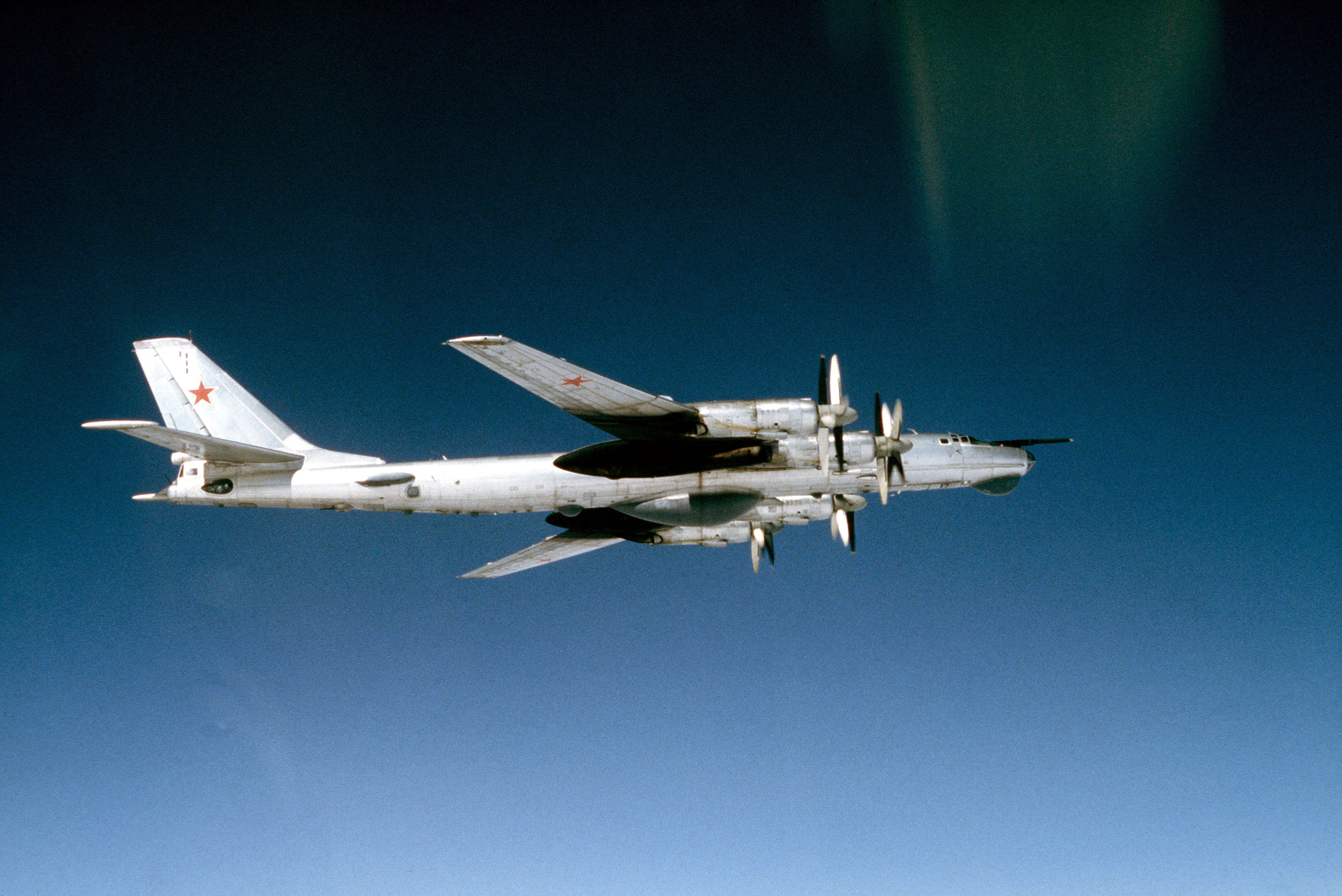
A Tu-95RTs "Bear-D" of Soviet Naval Aviation in flight in May 1983

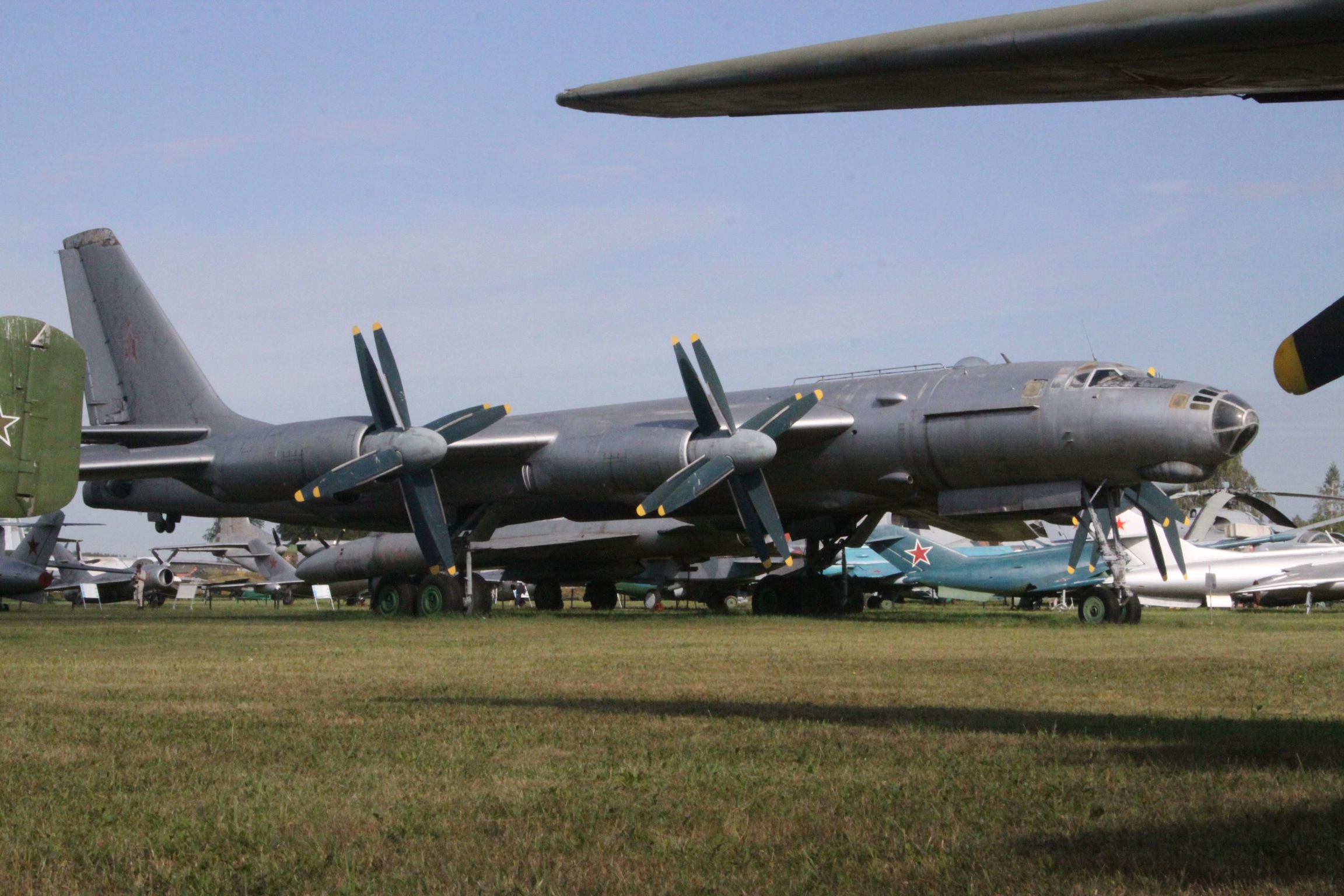
Tupolev Tu-95LL

Tu-95/1
The first prototype powered by Kuznetsov 2TV-2F coupled turboprop engines.
Tu-95/2
The second prototype powered by Kuznetsov NK-12 turboprops.
Tu-95
Basic variant of the long-range strategic bomber and the only model of the aircraft never fitted with a nose refuelling probe. Known to NATO as the "Bear-A".
Tu-95K
Experimental version for air-dropping a MiG-19 SM-20 jet aircraft.
Tu-95K22
Conversions of the older "Bear" bombers, reconfigured to carry the Raduga Kh-22 missile and incorporating modern avionics. Known to NATO as the "Bear-G".
Tu-95K/Tu-95KD
Designed to carry the Kh-20 air-to-surface missile. The Tu-95KD aircraft were the first to be outfitted with nose probes. Known to NATO as the "Bear-B".
Tu-95KM
Modified and upgraded versions of the Tu-95K, most notable for their enhanced reconnaissance systems. These were in turn converted into the "Bear-G" configuration. Known to NATO as the "Bear-C".
Tu-95LAL
Experimental nuclear-powered aircraft project.
Tu-95M
Modification of the serial Tu-95 with the NK-12M engines. 19 were built.
Tu-95M-55
Missile carrier.
Tu-95MR
Derivative of Tu-95M modified for photo-reconnaissance. Four built. Entered service in 1964. Later used as crew trainers and withdrawn from use in early 1990s. Known to NATO as the "Bear-E".
Tu-95MS/Tu-95MS6/Tu-95MS16
Completely new cruise missile carrier platform based on the Tu-142 airframe. This variant became the launch platform of the Raduga Kh-55 cruise missile and put into serial production in 1981. Known to NATO as the "Bear-H" and was referred to by the U.S. military as a Tu-142 for some time in the 1980s before its true designation became known. Currently being modernized to carry the Kh-101/102 stealth cruise missiles. 21 aircraft have been modernized as of April 2019. In 2019–2020, 10 modernized Tu-95MS aircraft have joined the fleet. 4 aircraft were delivered in 2021.

Tu-95MS6
Capable of carrying six Kh-55, Kh-55SM or Kh-555 cruise missiles on a rotary launcher in the aircraft's weapons bay. 32 were built.
Tu-95MS16
Fitted with four underwing pylons in addition to the rotary launcher in the fuselage, giving a maximum load of 16 Kh-55s or 14 Kh-55SMs. 56 were built.

Tu-95MSM
Modernization of the "Tu-95MS16" bombers, equipped with the new Novella-NV1.021 radar, SOI-021 information display system, Meteor-NM2 airborne defense complex and upgraded Kuznetsov NK-12MPM turboprop engines. First flight was on the end of 2019. Can fire Kh-101 missiles.
Tu-95N
Experimental version for air-dropping an RS ramjet powered aircraft.
Tu-95RTs
Variant of the basic "Bear-A" configuration, redesigned for maritime reconnaissance and targeting for submarine-launched P-6 Progress (NATO code name: Shaddock) missiles for service in the Soviet Naval Aviation. Fitted with large radome under central fuselage. First flight 21 September 1962. 40 built, entering service in May 1966. Retired 1993–1994. Known to NATO as the "Bear-D".
Tu-95U
Training variant, modified from surviving "Bear-A"s but now all have been retired. Known to NATO as the "Bear-T".
Tu-95V
Special carrier aircraft to test-drop the largest thermonuclear weapon ever designed, the Tsar Bomba.
Tu-96
Long-range intercontinental high-altitude strategic bomber prototype, designed to climb up to 16,000–17,000 m (52,000–56,000 ft). It was a high-altitude version of the Tupolev Tu-95 aircraft with high-altitude augmented turboprop TV-16 engines and with a new, enlarged-area wing. Plant tests of the aircraft were performed with non-high altitude TV-12 engines in 1955–1956.

=== Tu-95 derivatives ===
Tu-114
Airliner derivative of Tu-95.
Tu-116
Tu-95 fitted with passenger cabins as a stop-gap while the Tu-114 was being developed. 2 were converted.
Tu-126
AEW&C derivative of Tu-114, itself derived from the Tu-95.
Tu-142
Maritime reconnaissance/anti-submarine warfare derivative of Tu-95. Known to NATO as the "Bear-F".

Several other modifications of the basic Tu-95/Tu-142 airframe have existed, but these were largely unrecognized by Western intelligence or never reached operational status in the Soviet military.

== Operators ==
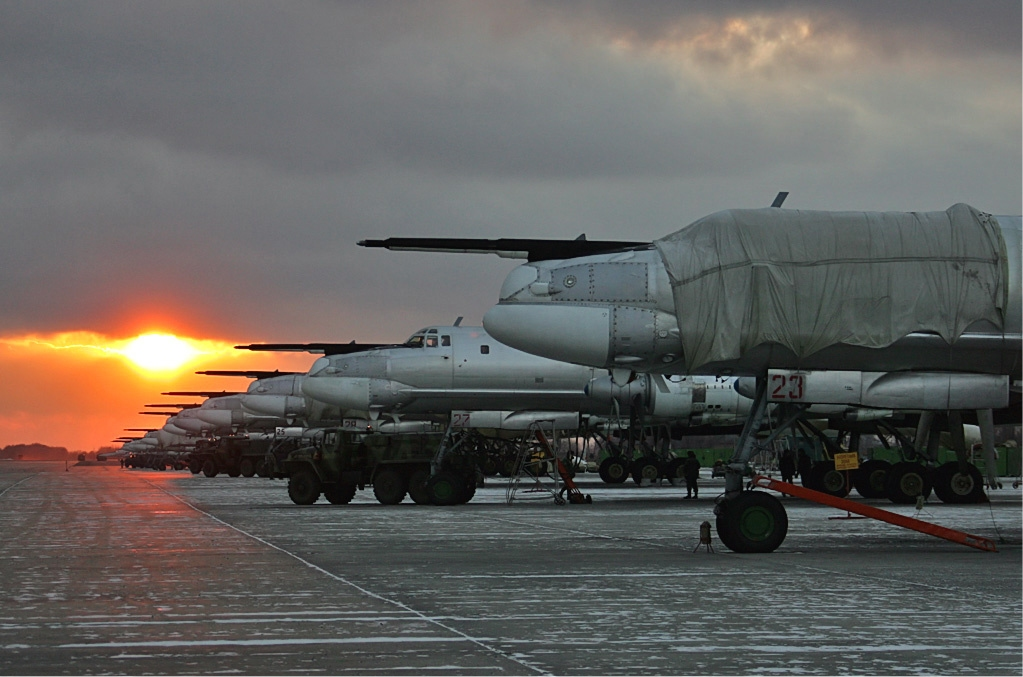
A lineup at sunset of Tu-95MS at Engels Air Force Base in December 2005.

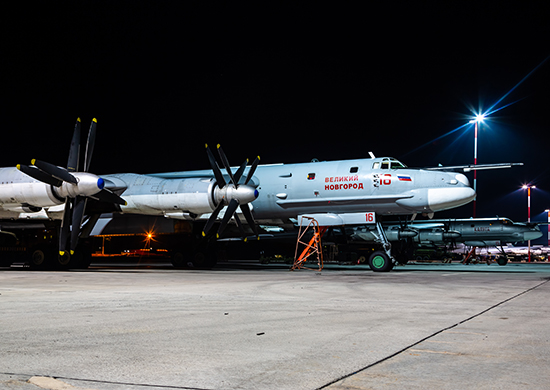
Tu-95MS Veliky Novgorod

Russia

- Russian Aerospace Forces – 55 Tu-95MS were in service as of 2020. Only 36 are estimated to remain airworthy as of September 2026.
  - 22nd Guards Heavy Bomber Aviation Division, 6950th Guards Air Base – Engels-2 (air base), Saratov Oblast
    - Olenya (air base), aircraft relocated from Engels after Ukrainian drone attacks, in September 2022; in spring 2023 "more than 10" were located here, in January 2024 11 Tu-95 were seen, and by February 2024 10 Tu-95 had been detected at Olenya
  - 121st Heavy Bomber Aviation Regiment
  - 184th Guards Heavy Bomber Aviation Regiment
  - 326th Heavy Bomber Aviation Division, 6952nd Air Base – Ukrainka (air base), Amur Oblast
  - 182nd Heavy Bomber Aviation Regiment
  - 79th Heavy Bomber Aviation Regiment
  - 43rd Center for Combat Application and Training of Aircrew for Long Range Aviation – Dyagilevo (air base), Ryazan Oblast
  - 2nd Instructor Heavy Bomber Aviation Regiment

=== Former operators ===
Soviet Union

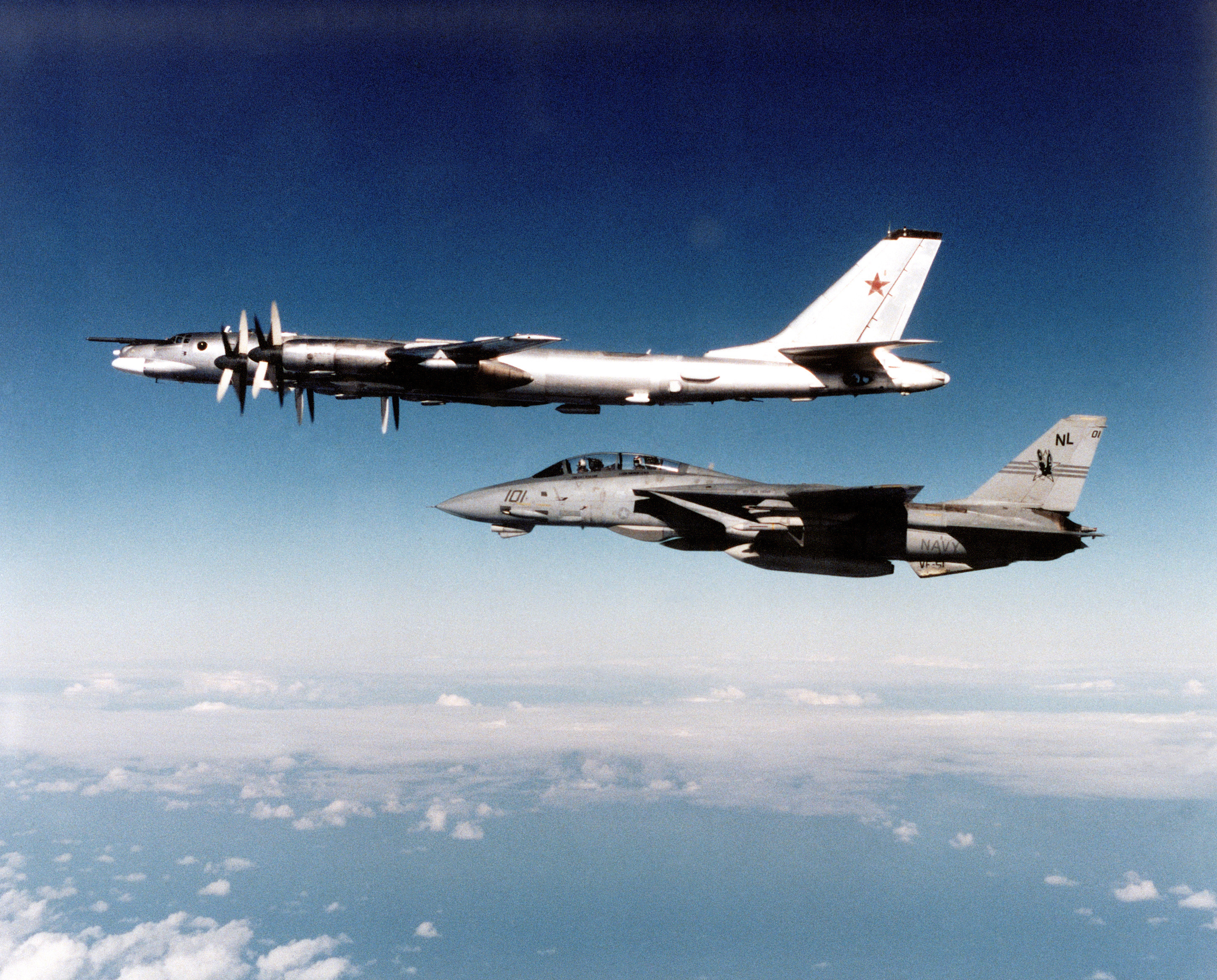
A Tu-95K22 "Bear-G" escorted by an F-14A Tomcat, 1991.

- Soviet Air Forces – aircraft were transferred to Russian and Ukrainian Air Forces after the dissolution of the Soviet Union.
  - 106th Heavy Bomber Air Division – the first Tu-95s division formed in 1956. The division commander was twice-Hero of the Soviet Union A. G. Molodchi.
    - 1006th Heavy Bomber Aviation Regiment – Uzyn Air Base, Kiev Oblast, Ukrainian SSR
    - 409th Heavy Bomber Aviation Regiment – Uzyn Air Base, Kiev Oblast, Ukrainian SSR
    - 182nd Guards Heavy Bomber Aviation Regiment – Mozdok, Severo-Osetinskaya ASSR
  - 79th Heavy Bomber Aviation Division – Dolon (air base), Semipalatinsk Oblast, Kazakh SSR
    - 1223rd Heavy Bomber Aviation Regiment
    - 1226th Heavy Bomber Aviation Regiment
  - 73rd Heavy Bomber Aviation Division – Ukrainka (air base), Amur Oblast, Russian SFSR
    - 40th Heavy Bomber Aviation Regiment – united with the 182nd TBAP in 1998 at the Ukrainka Air Base
    - 79th Heavy Bomber Aviation Regiment
- Soviet Naval Aviation
  - 392nd Separate Long-Range Reconnaissance Aviation Regiment – Kipelovo, Vologda Oblast, Russian SFSR
  - 304th Separate Long-Range Reconnaissance Aviation Regiment – Khorol Airfield, Primorsky Krai, Russian SFSR
  - 169th Independent Guards Mixed Aviation Regiment – Cam Ranh Base, Khánh Hòa Province, Vietnam

Ukraine

- Ukrainian Air Force – inherited 23–29 Tu-95MS aircraft after the collapse of the Soviet Union, and subsequently handed 3 Tu-95MS and 581 Kh-55 cruise missiles to Russia as exchange for gas debt relief in 2000; the remainder were scrapped under the Nunn–Lugar Cooperative Threat Reduction agreement led by the US.
  - 106th Heavy Bomber Air Division – Uzyn Air Base, Kyiv Oblast
    - 1006th Heavy Bomber Regiment
- Mykolaiv Aircraft Repair Plant – 2 Tu-95MS converted to ecological reconnaissance aircraft in storage, before they were sold for scrapping in 2013.
- Bila Tserkva Aircraft Repair Plant – 5 Russian Tu-95s scrapped at the plant, after an agreement between the Cabinet of Ministers of Ukraine and the Government of Russia.
- 1 Tu-95MS in the Museum of Long Range Aviation in Poltava and 1 Tu-95 in Mykolaiv Oblast.

== Specifications (Tu-95MS) ==

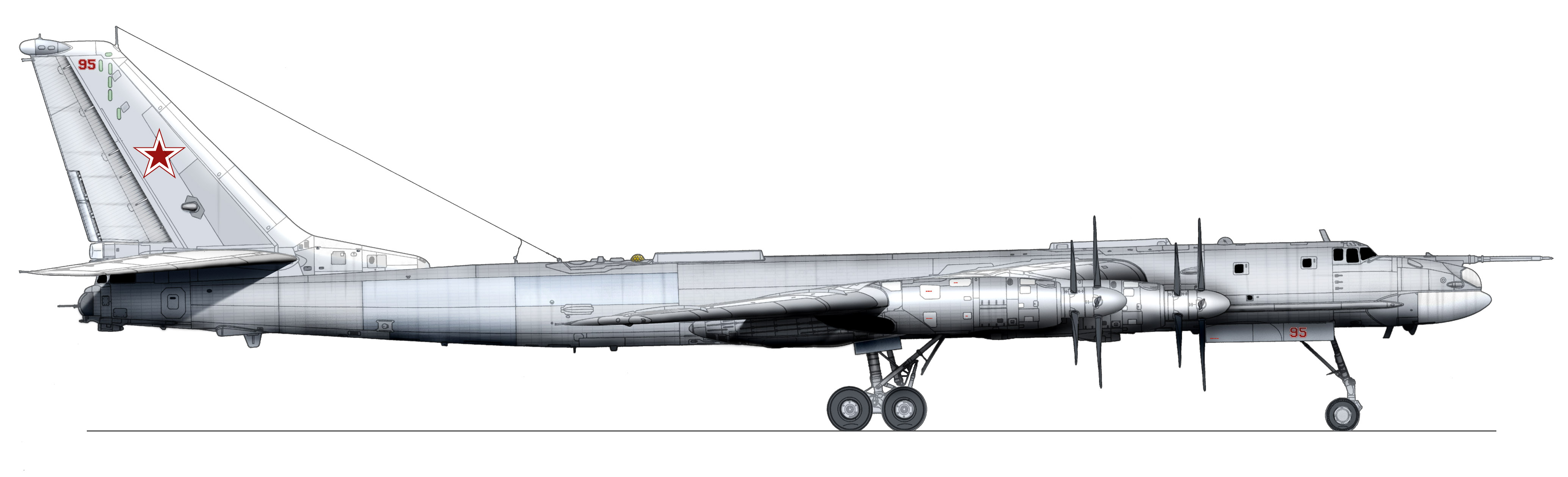
Right view of the Tupolev Tu-95MS

Data from Combat Aircraft since 1945

General characteristics

- Crew: 6–7; pilot, co-pilot, flight engineer, communications system operator, navigator, tail gunner, plus additional navigator, depending on mission profile.
- Length: 46.2 m (151 ft 7 in)
- Wingspan: 50.1 m (164 ft 4 in)
- Height: 12.12 m (39 ft 9 in)
- Wing area: 310 m^{2} (3,300 sq ft)
- Empty weight: 90,000 kg (198,416 lb)
- Gross weight: 171,000 kg (376,990 lb)
- Max takeoff weight: 188,000 kg (414,469 lb)
- Fuel capacity: 148,150 lb (67,200 kg)
- Powerplant: 4 × Kuznetsov NK-12 turboprop engines 15,000 PS (15,000 hp; 11,000 kW)
- Propellers: 8-bladed contra-rotating fully feathering constant-speed propellers

Performance

- Maximum speed: 925 km/h (575 mph, 499 kn)
- Cruise speed: 710 km/h (440 mph, 380 kn)
- Range: 15,000 km (9,300 mi, 8,100 nmi)
- Service ceiling: 13,716 m (45,000 ft)
- Rate of climb: 10 m/s (2,000 ft/min)
- Wing loading: 606 kg/m^{2} (124 lb/sq ft)
- Power/mass: 0.235 kW/kg (0.143 hp/lb)

Armament

- Guns: 2 × 23 mm (0.906 in) Gryazev-Shipunov GSh-23 autocannon in tail turret
- Missiles: Up to 15,000 kg (33,000 lb), including the Kh-20, Kh-22, and Kh-55/101/102, or 8 Kh-101/102 cruise missiles mounted on underwing pylons.

== See also ==
Related development

- Tupolev Tu-114
- Tupolev Tu-119
- Tupolev Tu-126
- Tupolev Tu-142

Aircraft of comparable role, configuration, and era

- Convair B-36
- Boeing XB-55
- Boeing B-52 Stratofortress
- Myasishchev M-4 Molot
- Xian H-6K

Related lists

- List of bomber aircraft
- List of military aircraft of the Soviet Union and the CIS

== Bibliography ==
- Bukharin, Oleg, Pavel L. Podvig and Frank von Hippel. Russian Strategic Nuclear Forces. Boston: MIT Press, 2004. ISBN 978-0-262-66181-2.
- Dawes, Alan. "Tupolev Bears (Part Two)". Air International. Vol. 63, No. 1, July 2002. pp 77–83. ISSN 0306-5634.
- Duffy, Paul and Andrei Kandalov. Tupolev: The Man and His Aircraft. Shrewsbury, UK: Airlife, 1996. ISBN 978-1-85310-728-3.
- Eden, Paul (editor). The Encyclopedia of Modern Military Aircraft. London: Amber Books, 2004. ISBN 978-1-904687-84-9.
- Gordon, Yefim and Peter Davidson. Tupolev Tu-95 Bear. North Branch, Minnesota: Specialty Press, 2006. ISBN 978-1-58007-102-4.
- Grant, R.G. and John R. Dailey. Flight: 100 Years of Aviation. Harlow, Essex: DK Adult, 2007. ISBN 978-0-7566-1902-2.
- Healey, John K. (January–February 2004). "Retired Warriors: 'Cold War' Bomber Legacy". Air Enthusiast. No. 109. pp. 75–79. ISSN 0143-5450.
- Mladenov, Alexander. "Still Going Strong". Air International. Vol. 89, No. 2, August 2015. pp. 40–47. ISSN 0306-5634.
- Wilson, Stewart. Combat Aircraft since 1945. Fyshwick, Australia: Aerospace Publications, 2000. ISBN 978-1-875671-50-2.
