= Khorol Airfield =

Khorol
- IATA: none; ICAO: XHIL

Summary
- Airport type: Military
- Owner: Ministry of Defence
- Location: Khorol, Primorsky Krai
- Built: Unknown
- In use: Unknown
- Elevation AMSL: 312 ft / 95 m
- Coordinates: 44°27′01″N 132°07′31″E

Map
- Location in Primorsky Krai

Runways
Direction	Length		Surface
Direction	ft	m	Surface
15/33	12,139	3,700	Concrete

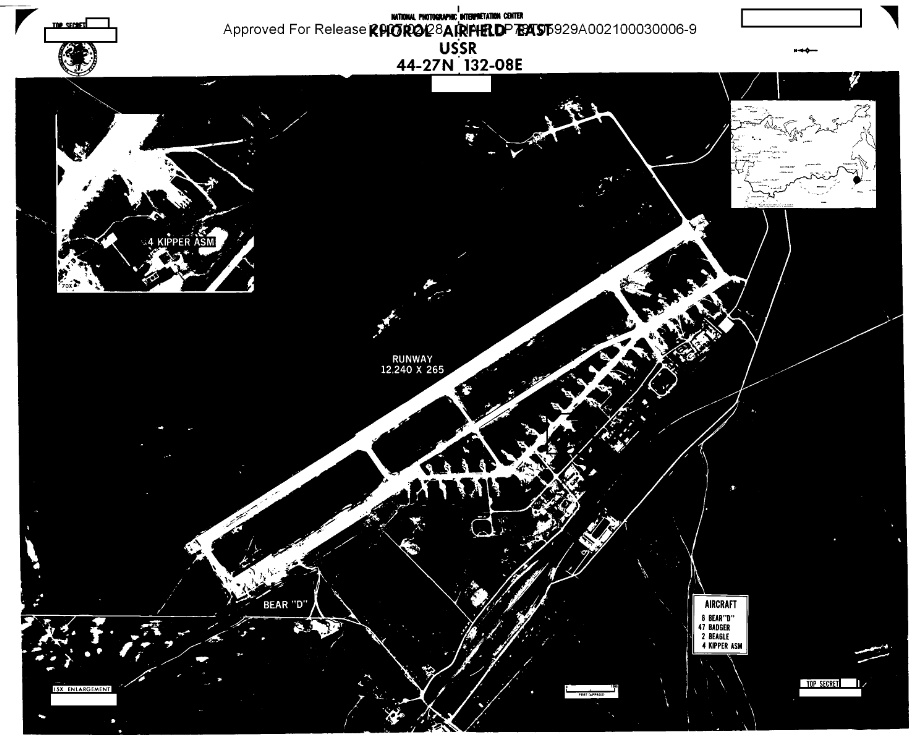
Khorol Airfield as seen on declassified satellite imagery in 1966.

Khorol Airfield, also known in the US intelligence community as Khorol East, is a Soviet Naval Aviation base in Primorsky Krai, Russia located 3 km (2 mi) east of Khorol, Russia. Khorol was designed as a heavy bomber airfield. It was subordinate to the Far East Air Army. However it was largely a Soviet Naval Aviation base.

After a runway extension in 1964 from 2500 m to 3700 m it had one of the largest runways in eastern Russia.

It was jointly occupied by two regiments of the Pacific Fleet Air Force.

From 1965 the 867th independent Guards Long-Range Reconnaissance Aviation Regiment (ODRAP) was stationed at the base flying the Tu-95RTS. In 1971 it became the 304th Independent Guards Long-Range Reconnaissance Aviation Regiment. It was reported in a CIA Key Hole report of April 1968. The regiment was disbanded in 1993.

The 169th Guards Maritime Missile Aviation Regiment moved from Khorol in 1982 to Cam Ranh Bay, Vietnam. It had been flying Tupolev Tu-16 (ASCC "Badger") since 1957, and was reported by photographic reconnaissance in 1971 It had as many as 71 aircraft in 1964.

The other major heavy bomber base in Primorskiy Krai is Vozdvizhenka air base, 39 mi (62 km) to the southwest. It targets the United States and has nuclear storage facilities, while Khorol's interest is primarily Pacific naval activity and has no nuclear storage.
