= Aleksey Perelet =

Soviet test pilot (1914-1953)

- Native name: Алексей Дмитриевич Перелёт
- Born: 14 January 1914; Voronki, Poltava Region, Russian Empire (present-day Ukraine)
- Died: 11 May 1953 (aged 39) Moscow, USSR
- Allegiance: Soviet Union
- Branch: Soviet Air Force
- Service years: 1939–1953
- Rank: Major
- Conflicts: World War II

Alexey Dmitrievich Perelet (Russian: Алексей Дмитриевич Перелёт; 14 January 1914 – 11 May 1953) was a Soviet pilot who was the principal test pilot for military aircraft prototypes produced by Tupolev during World War II. Perelet was born in the village of Voronki, then part of the Russian Empire and started his test pilot career in 1943, working for the Tupolev aerospace and defense company. He tested and flew the following planes: Tu-4, Tu-10, Tu-16, Tu-77, Tu-82, Tu-85 and Tu-95. He died on 11 May 1953 in a crash while testing the Tu-95/1 prototype plane with 2TV-2F engines.
