= Khorol, Russia =

Rural locality in Primorsky Krai, Russia

Coordinates: 44°25′44″N 132°04′27″E

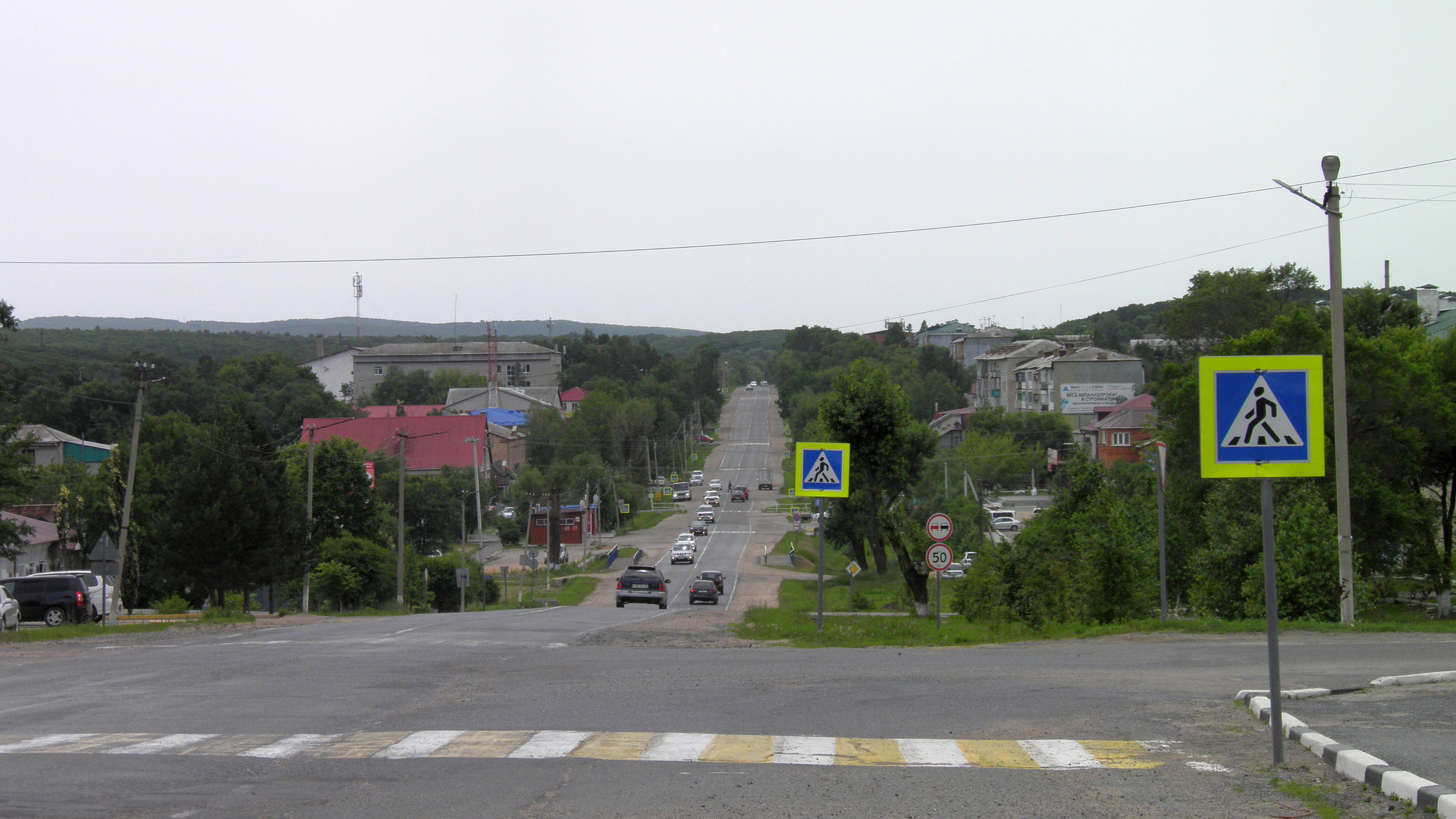
Khorol village, Leninskaya street

Khorol (Russian: Хороль) is a rural locality (a selo) and the administrative center of Khorolsky District, Primorsky Krai, Russia. Population: 10,860 (2010 census); 11,519 (2002 census); 15,643 (1989 Soviet census). Founded by Ukrainian settlers from Khorol in modern Poltava Oblast, Ukraine.
