= David Khorol =

Russian mathematician

David Moiseevich Khorol (Russian: Давид Моисеевич Хорол; February 4, 1920 — February 19, 1990) was a Soviet Jewish mathematician and aviation and rocket designer, professor, doctor of technical sciences. His last position was deputy general director of the Central Design Bureau "Geophysics" (ЦКБ «Геофизика»), known for its rocket design.

== Awards ==
For his works on design in the area of military technology David Khorol was awarded multiple state awards, including Order of Lenin (twice), Stalin Prize, Lenin Prize, USSR State Prize, title Hero of Socialist Labor.
