= Khorolsky, Voronezh Oblast =

Khorolsky Хорольский
- Settlement
- Location within Voronezh Oblast Location within Russia
- Coordinates: 51°00′N 40°48′E
- Country: Russia
- Region: Voronezh Oblast
- District: Talovsky District
- Time zone: UTC+3:00

Khorolsky (Russian: Хорольский) is a rural locality (a settlement) in Nizhnekamenskoye Rural Settlement, Talovsky District, Voronezh Oblast, Russia. The population was 128 as of 2010. There are 3 streets.

== Geography ==
Khorolsky is located 17 km southeast of Talovaya (the district's administrative centre) by road. Serikovo is the nearest rural locality.
