= Khorol (river) =

Khorol River
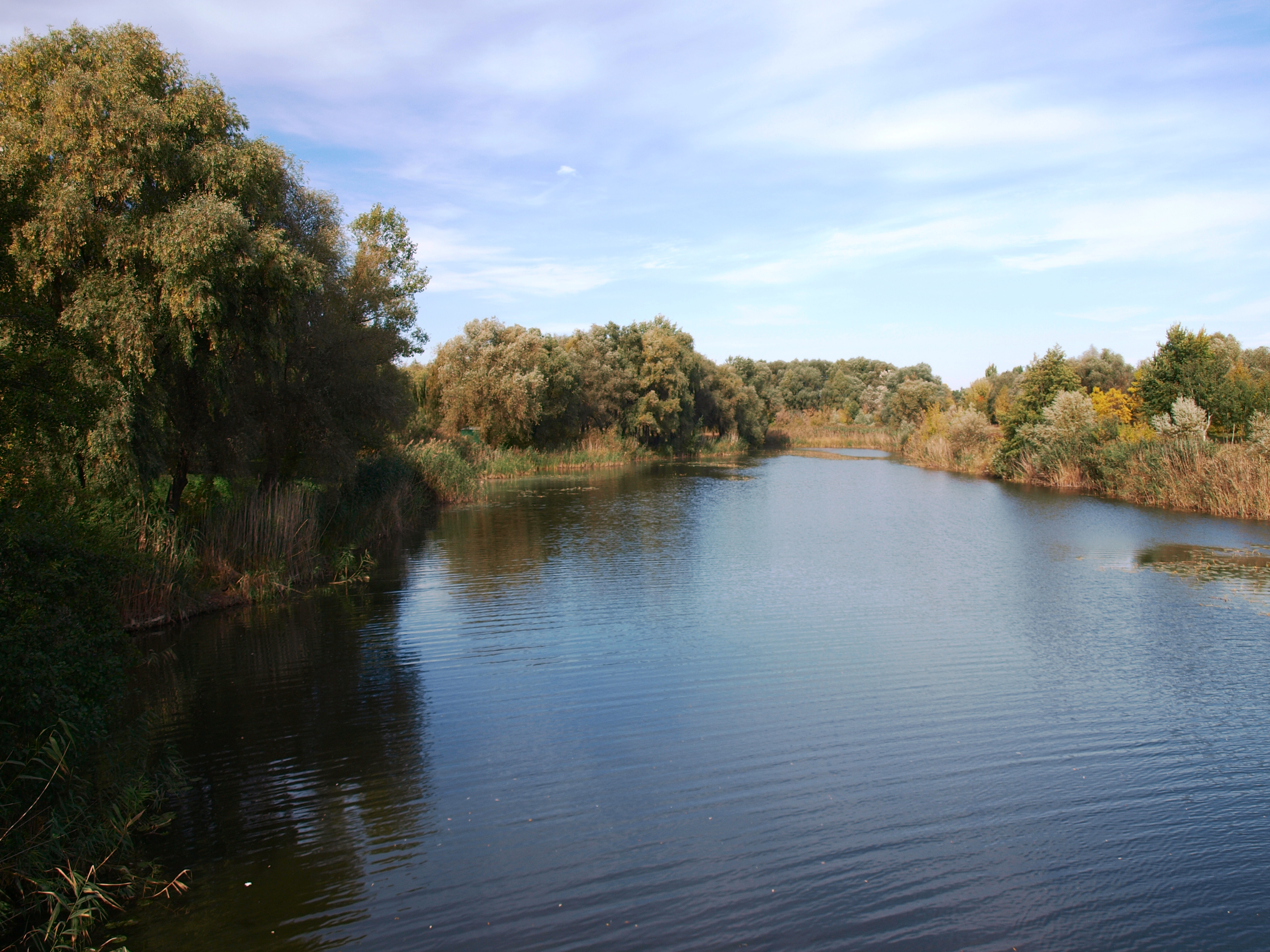
- Khorol in Myrhorod

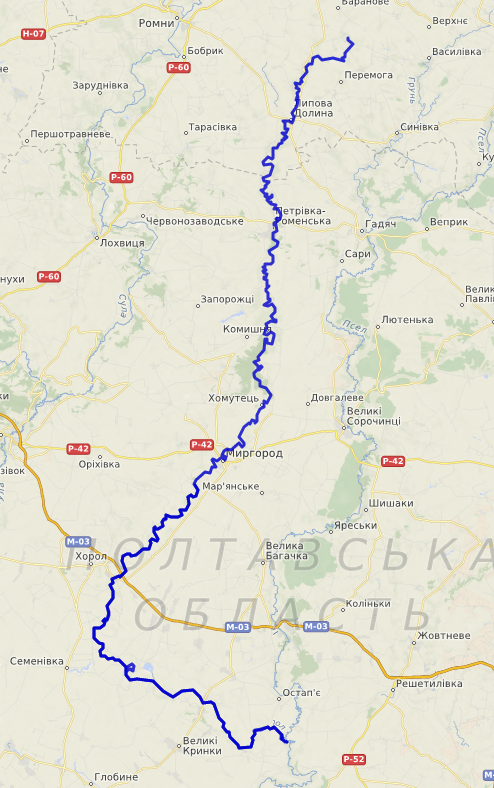

Location
- Country: Ukraine

Physical characteristics
- Source
  - location: Sumy Oblast, Ukraine
- Mouth
  - location: Psel
  - coordinates: 49°28′00″N 33°47′18″E
- Length: 308 km (191 mi)
- Basin size: 3,340 km^{2} (1,290 sq mi)

Basin features
- Progression: Psel→ Dnieper→ Dnieper–Bug estuary→ Black Sea
- Tributaries
  - left: Berezivka, Staraya Saha, Rudka, Buda, Kholodna
  - right: Sakunykha, Rubanka, Vilshana, Tataryna, Oznytsia, Lykhobabivka, Kharpachka, Khomutets, Gremiacha, Kuturzhykha, Avramivka, Lahodynka, Holubykha, Yenkivka, Kryva Ruda, Saha, Tataryna, Shcherbanka

The Khorol (Ukrainian: Хорол) is a river in Ukraine, a tributary of the Psel in the Dnieper River Basin. It is 308 kilometres (191 mi) long and has a drainage basin of 3,340 square kilometres (1,290 sq mi). The Khorol River sources its water near the village of Chervona Sloboda in Nedryhailiv Raion, Sumy Oblast.

== General data ==
The Khorol River stretches for a total length of 308 km, with 241 km of its course located within the Poltava region. The river's catchment area spans 3,870 km^{2}. The slope length of the river measures 0.3 m/km. The valley of the Khorol River is trapezoidal and asymmetric, characterized by varying flat slopes ranging from 10 to 12 km in length.

The floodplain width of the river ranges from 0.2 to 0.5 km to 1.5–2 km and features diverse vegetation, including marshy areas, shrubs, and meadows. The river channel itself exhibits a wavy pattern and varies in width between 10 and 60 meters.

The region experiences a rainy and snowy climate, with spring runoff accounting for approximately 85% of the total annual runoff. The average long-term water consumption of the Khorol River at Khorol (Myrhorod) is approximately 3.8 m^{3}/s.

The mineralization of the river's water fluctuates throughout the year, with measurements indicating 843 mg/dm³ during the spring flood, 966 mg/dm³ during summer and autumn, and 1053 mg/dm³ during winter. The river typically freezes towards the end of November or early December and thaws in March.

== Main tributaries ==
The Khorol River is fed by several main tributaries on both its right and left banks. Some of the significant tributaries on the right side include Sakunykha, Rubanka, Vilshana, Tataryna, Oznytsia, Lykhobabivka, Kharpachka, Khomutets, Gremiacha, Kuturzhykha, Avramivka, Lahodynka, Holubykha, Yenkivka, Kryva Ruda, Saha, Tataryna, and Shcherbanka.

On the left bank, the main tributaries include Berezivka, Staraya Saha, Rudka, Buda, and Kholodna. These tributaries contribute to the overall flow and water volume of the Khorol River, enhancing its hydrological characteristics and supporting the surrounding ecosystem.

== Populated points ==
The towns of Lypova Dolyna and Khorol both lie on the Khorol River. The resort town of Myrhorod also lies along the river.

== Use ==
The Khorol river water is used for general water supply, irrigation and fishing. Several dams and reservoirs have been constructed on the river.

== Khorol in history and culture ==
A settlement dating back to the Bronze Age was found in the river valley, as well as early Slavic settlements and the burial ground of Chernyakhiv culture. A battle between the Rusyns and Polovtsian troops took place on the banks of the river in 1185. The landscapes of Khorol have attracted the attention of many artists. The river was described by the famous Ukrainian poet of the 20th century, Pavlo Tychyna, as:

"Smoke, smoke from cars,

Like maiden summer.

Mirgorod have changed

Khorol River is not what it was...

(Дим, димок від машин,

Мов дівочі літа.

Не той тепер Миргород,

Хорол-річка не та...)

== Geography ==
The Khorol begins from its channels and goes north of the village of Chervona Sloboda, flows by the Prydniprovska lowland on the territory of Nedryhailiv, Lypova Dolyna, near Sumy oblast, Myrhorod, Lubny, Semenivka and Kremenchuk Raions of Poltava oblast. Khorol flows mainly to the south, between the cities of Myrhorod and Khorol — to the southwest, then to the south-east. It also flows into Psel on the northern outskirts of the village of Popivka, Hlobyne and Poltava.

== Bibliography ==
- Географічна енциклопедія України: в 3-х томах / Редколегія: О. М. Маринич (відпов. ред.) та ін. — К.: «Українська радянська енциклопедія» імені М. П. Бажана, 1989.
- За ред. А.В. Кудрицького Полтавщина : Енцикл. довід.. — К.: УЕ, 1992. — С. 1024. ISBN 5-88500-033-6
- Енциклопедія українознавства. У 10-х томах. / Головний редактор Володимир Кубійович. — Париж; Нью-Йорк: Молоде життя, 1954–1989.
- «По річках України», К., 1938.
