= Khorol, Poltava Oblast =

City in Poltava Oblast, Ukraine

Khorol Хорол
- City
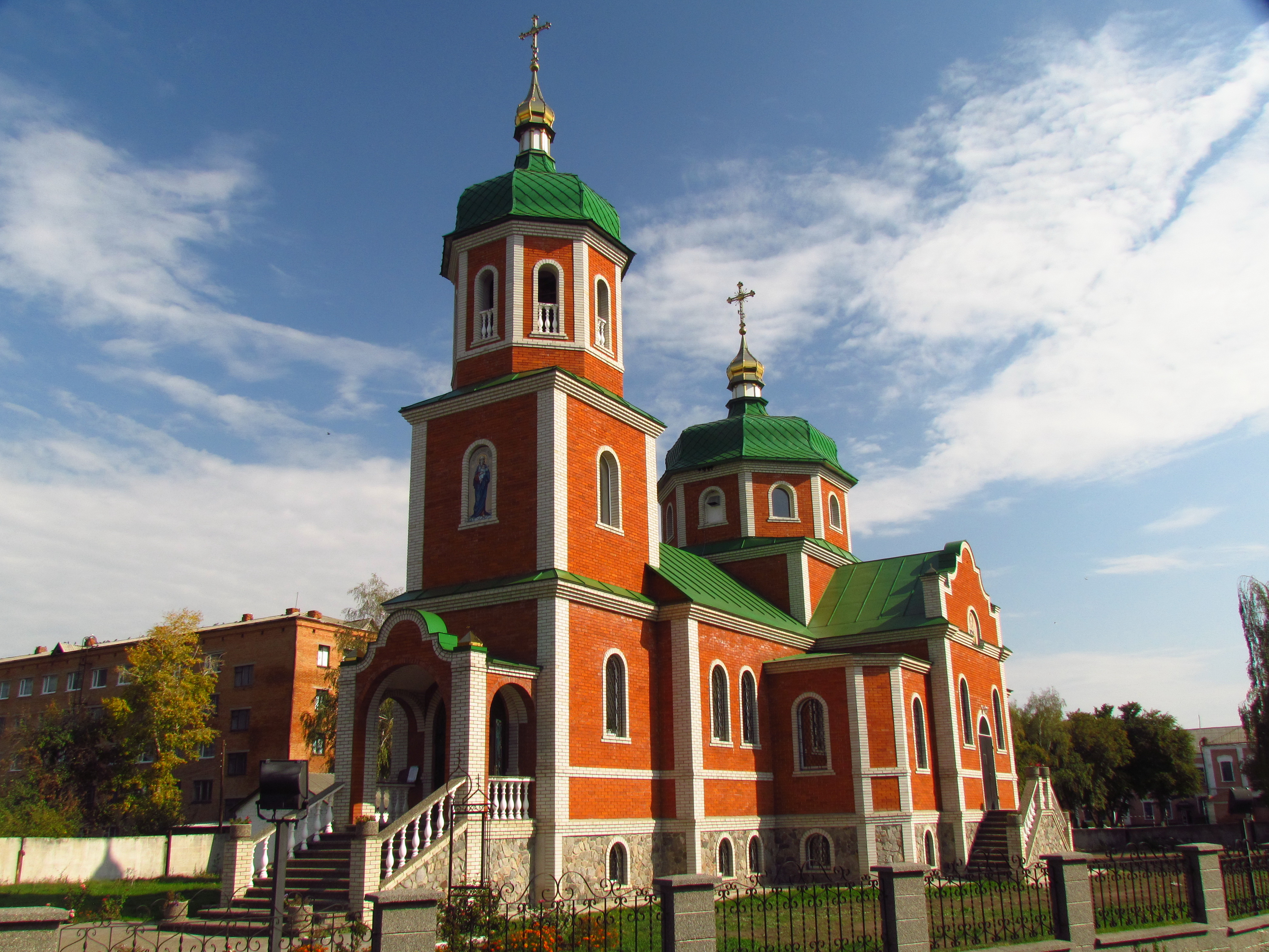
- Church of the Dormition

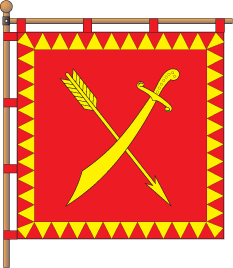
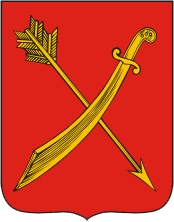
- Flag Coat of arms
- Interactive map of Khorol
- Location within Poltava Oblast Location within Ukraine
- Coordinates: 49°46′N 33°16′E
- Country: Ukraine
- Oblast: Poltava Oblast
- Raion: Lubny Raion
- Hromada: Khorol urban hromada

Population (2022)
  - Total: 12,540

Khorol (Ukrainian: Хорол, pronounced [xoˈrɔl]) is a city in Lubny Raion, Poltava Oblast, Ukraine. It hosts the administration of Khorol urban hromada, one of the hromadas of Ukraine. Population: 12,540 (2022 estimate).

Until 18 July 2020, Khorol was the administrative center of Khorol Raion. The raion was abolished in July 2020 as part of the administrative reform of Ukraine, which reduced the number of raions of Poltava Oblast to four. The area of Khorol Raion was merged into Lubny Raion.

== Name ==
The town is named after the Khorol River upon which it is situated.

== Geography ==
The Hrebinka is the center of the Hrebinka urban hromada is the northwest of the Lubny Raion. The distance from Hrebinka to the regional center is 190 kilometers, and to Kyiv - 156 km. The Hrebinka is located on the left bank of the Dnieper River. The city is located in the Dnieper lowland

The city of Khorol is located in the southern part of the Lubny Raion. The city is located on the Dnieper lowland, on the banks of the Rudka River, a tributary of the Khorol River. The villages of Vyshnyaki and Lisyanshchyna are located near the city. The city of Khorol is located in the forest steppe nature zone. There is a forests near the city.

The climate of the Khorol is temperate continental. The average temperature in January is −3.7 °C, in July it is +21.4 °C, the amount of precipitation is 480–580 mm/year, which falls mainly in the summer as rain.

Minerals of the Khorol territory: clay, sand.

The Kyiv-Kharkiv national highway (M-03) passes near Khorol. Interregional highways and a railway running in the Kyiv- Kremenchuk direction pass through the city.

== History ==
During the Ukrainian War of Independence, from 1917 to 1920, it passed between various factions. Afterwards, it was administratively part of the Kremenchuk Governorate of Ukraine, and after its dissolution of the Poltava Governorate of Ukraine.

During World War II, the German occupiers operated prisoner-of-war camps in Khorol, i.e. Dulag 160 from September 1941 to July 1942, Stalag 388 from July to September 1942, and Dulag 132 from August to September 1943. Terrible conditions, including severe overcrowding, malnutrition, poor medical care, forced labour and deliberate abuse, resulted in a high death rate in the camps.

== Population ==
=== Ethnicity ===
Distribution of the population by ethnicity according to the 2001 census:

Ethnic groups in Khorol
	percent
Ukrainians	96.43%
Russians	2.98%
Belarusians	0.20%
others	0.39%

=== Language ===
Distribution of the population by native language according to the 2001 census:

Language	Percentage
Ukrainian	97.21%
Russian	2.63%
other/undecided	0.16%

== Notable people ==
Notable natives of Khorol include Oles Ulianenko, Ben-Zion Dinur and Kateryna Antonovych-Melnyk.

== Gallery ==
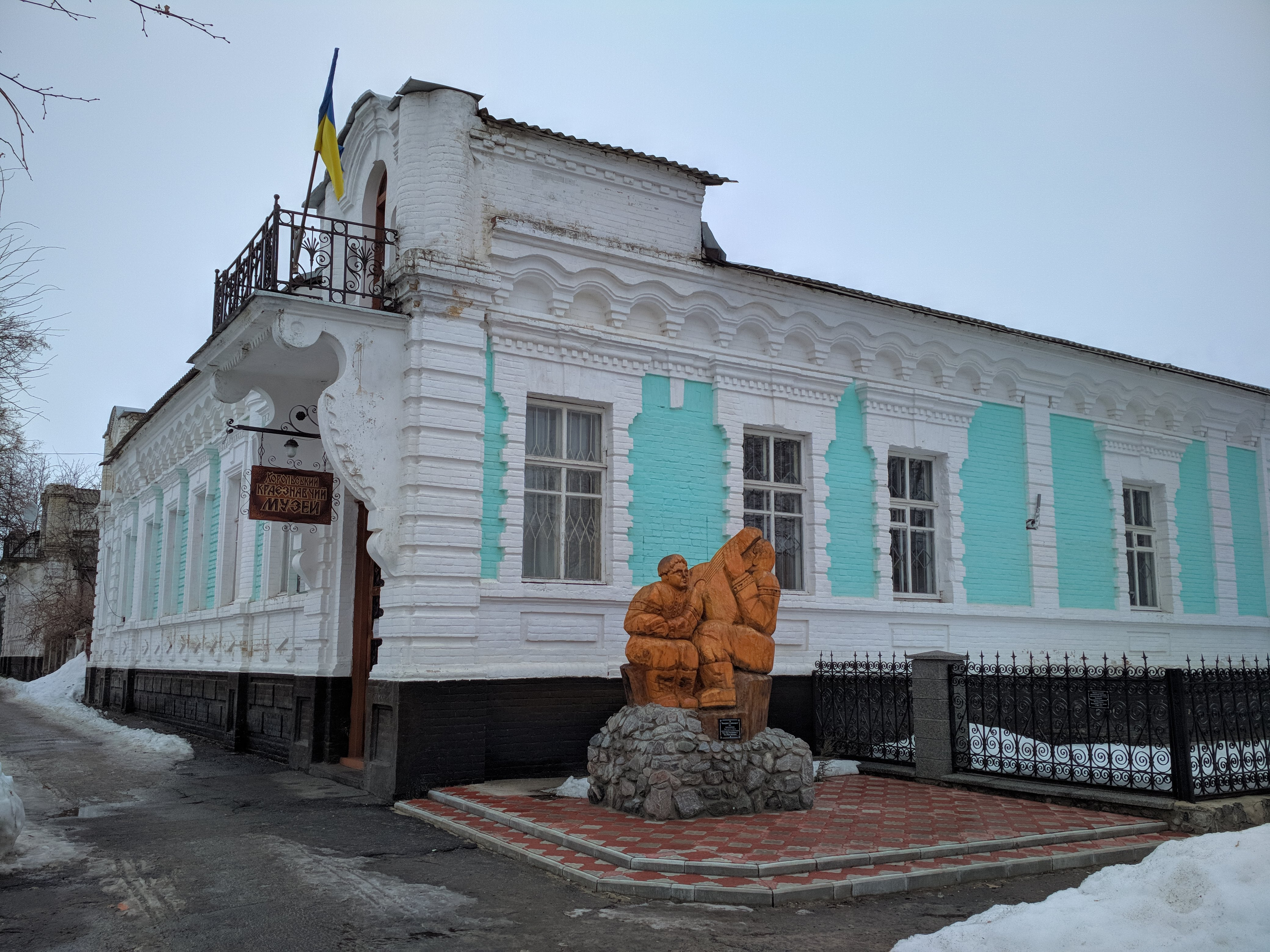
Local museum

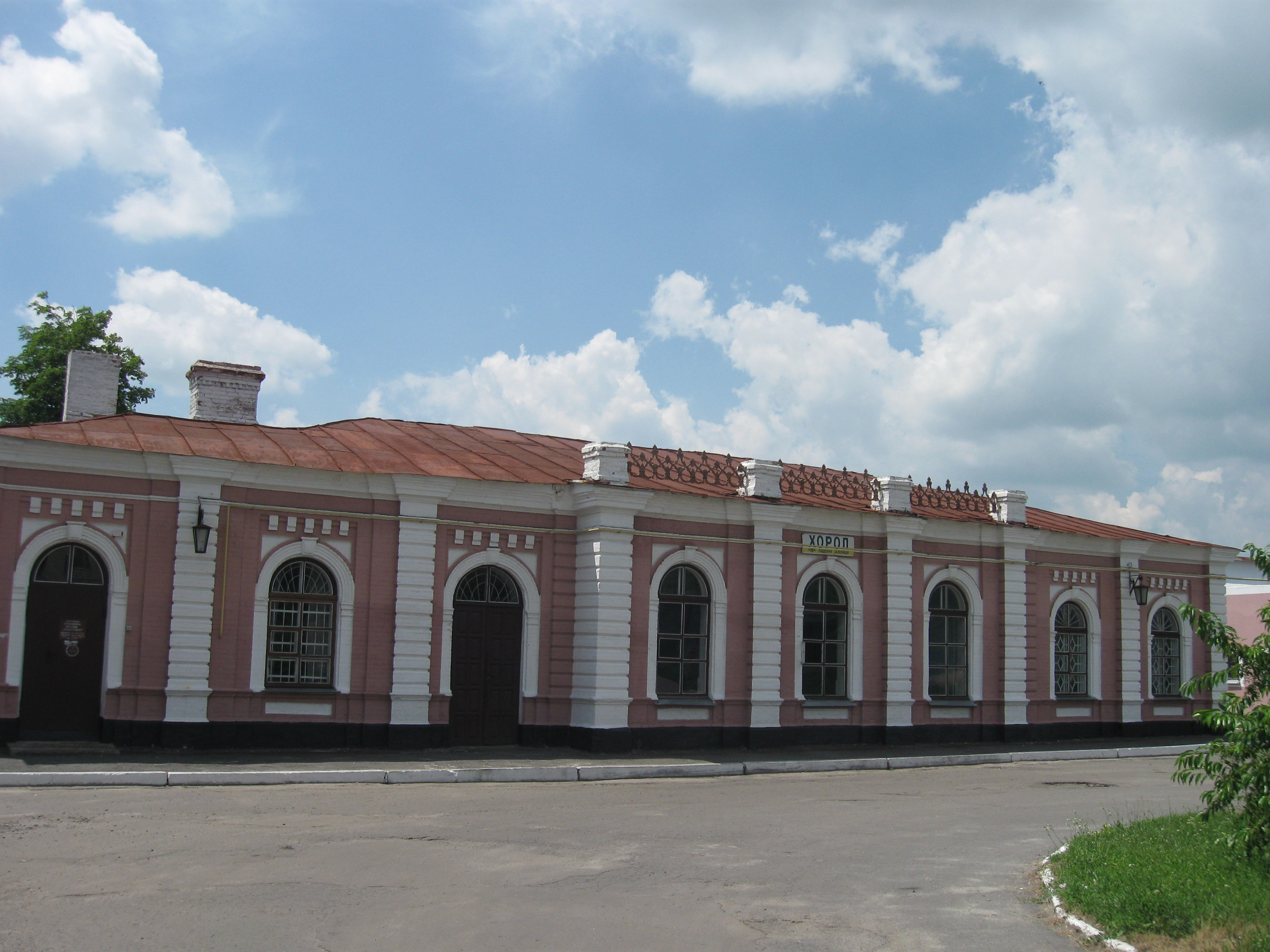
Railway station

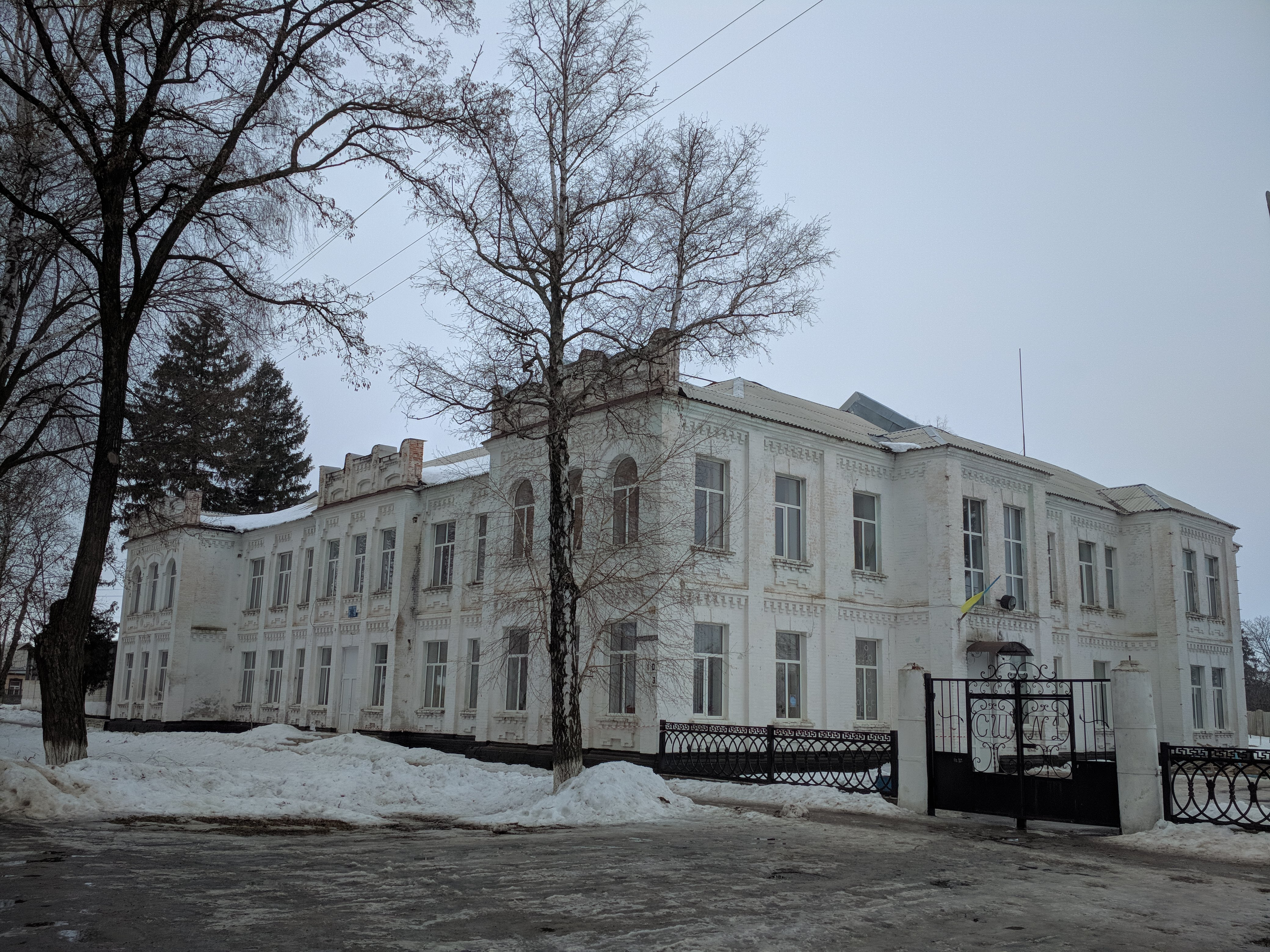
School No. 1

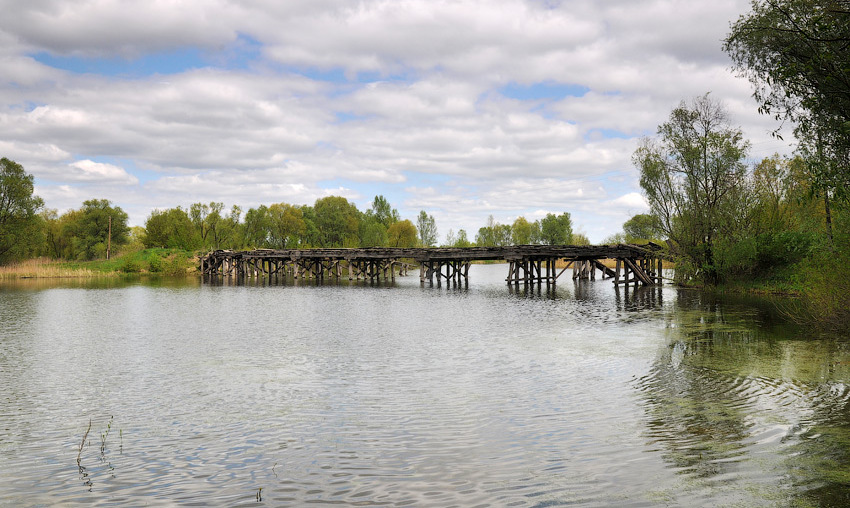
Khorol River
