= Khorol Raion =

Former subdivision of Poltava Oblast, Ukraine

Khorol Raion Хорольський район
- Raion
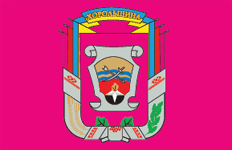
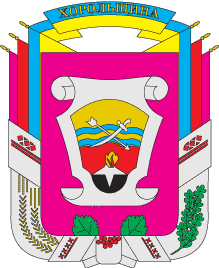
- Flag Coat of arms

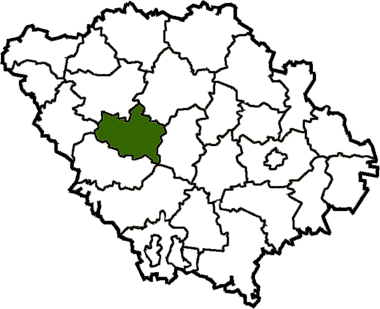
- Coordinates: 49°47′5.2254″N 33°15′54.327″E
- Country: Ukraine
- Oblast: Poltava Oblast
- Established: 7 March 1923
- Disestablished: 18 July 2020
- Admin. center: Khorol
- Subdivisions: List: — city councils; — settlement councils; — rural councils; Number of localities: — cities; — urban-type settlements; 92 — villages; — rural settlements

Government
  - Governor: Vitaliy Shevshuga

Area
  - Total: 1,062 km^{2} (410 sq mi)

Population (2020)
  - Total: 32,705
  - Density: 30.80/km^{2} (79.76/sq mi)
- Time zone: UTC+02:00 (EET)
  - Summer (DST): UTC+03:00 (EEST)
- Postal index: 37800—37874
- Area code: +380-5362
- Website: Official homepage

Khorol Raion (Ukrainian: Хорольський район) was a raion (district) in Poltava Oblast in central Ukraine. The raion's administrative center was the city of Khorol. The raion was abolished and its territory was merged into Lubny Raion on 18 July 2020 as part of the administrative reform of Ukraine, which reduced the number of raions of Poltava Oblast to four. The last estimate of the raion population was 32,705 (2020 est.)

At the time of disestablishment, the raion consisted of one hromadas, Khorol urban hromada with the administration in Khorol.

== Gallery ==
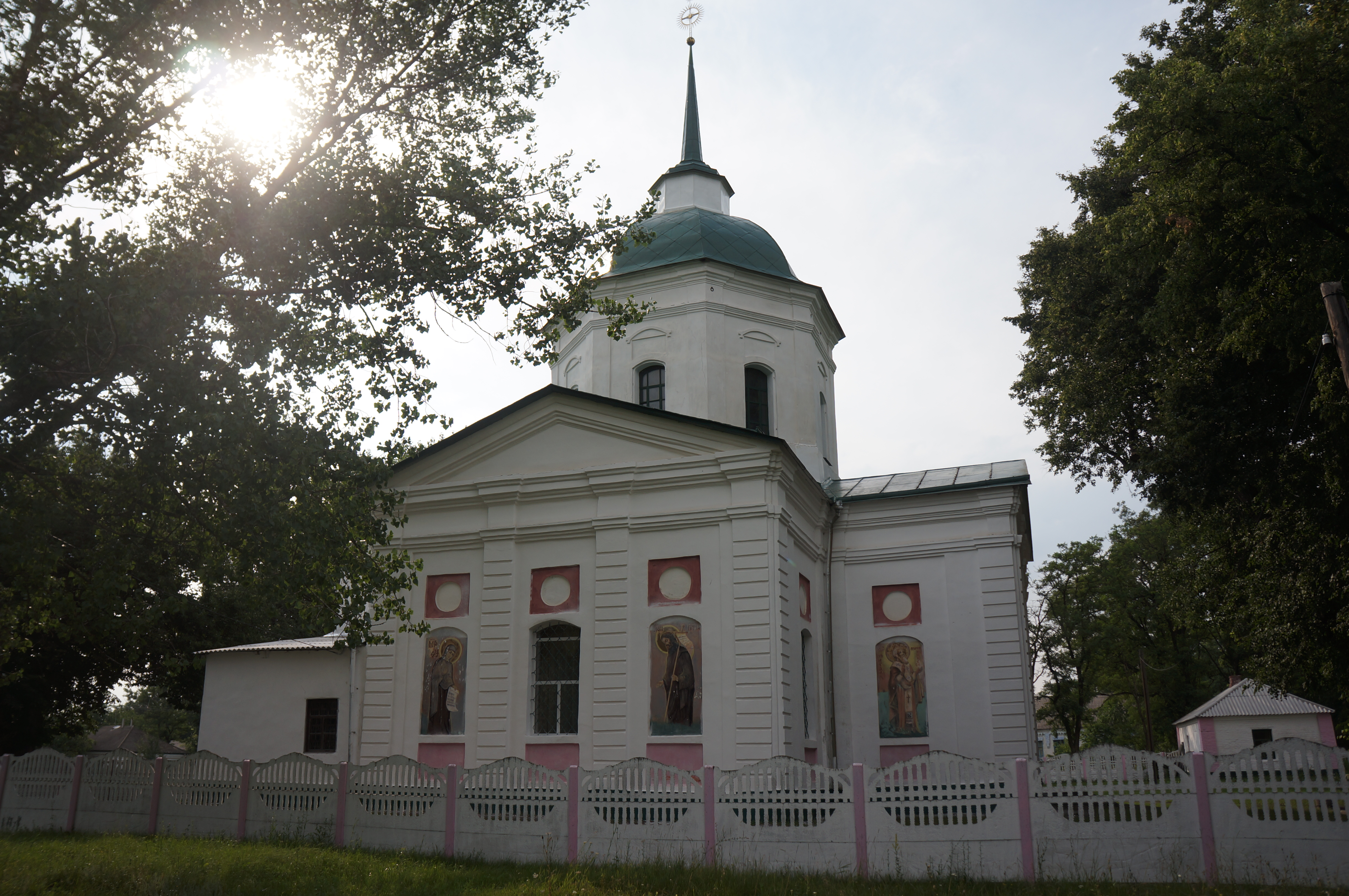
Trinity Church in Vyshniaky, Khorol district

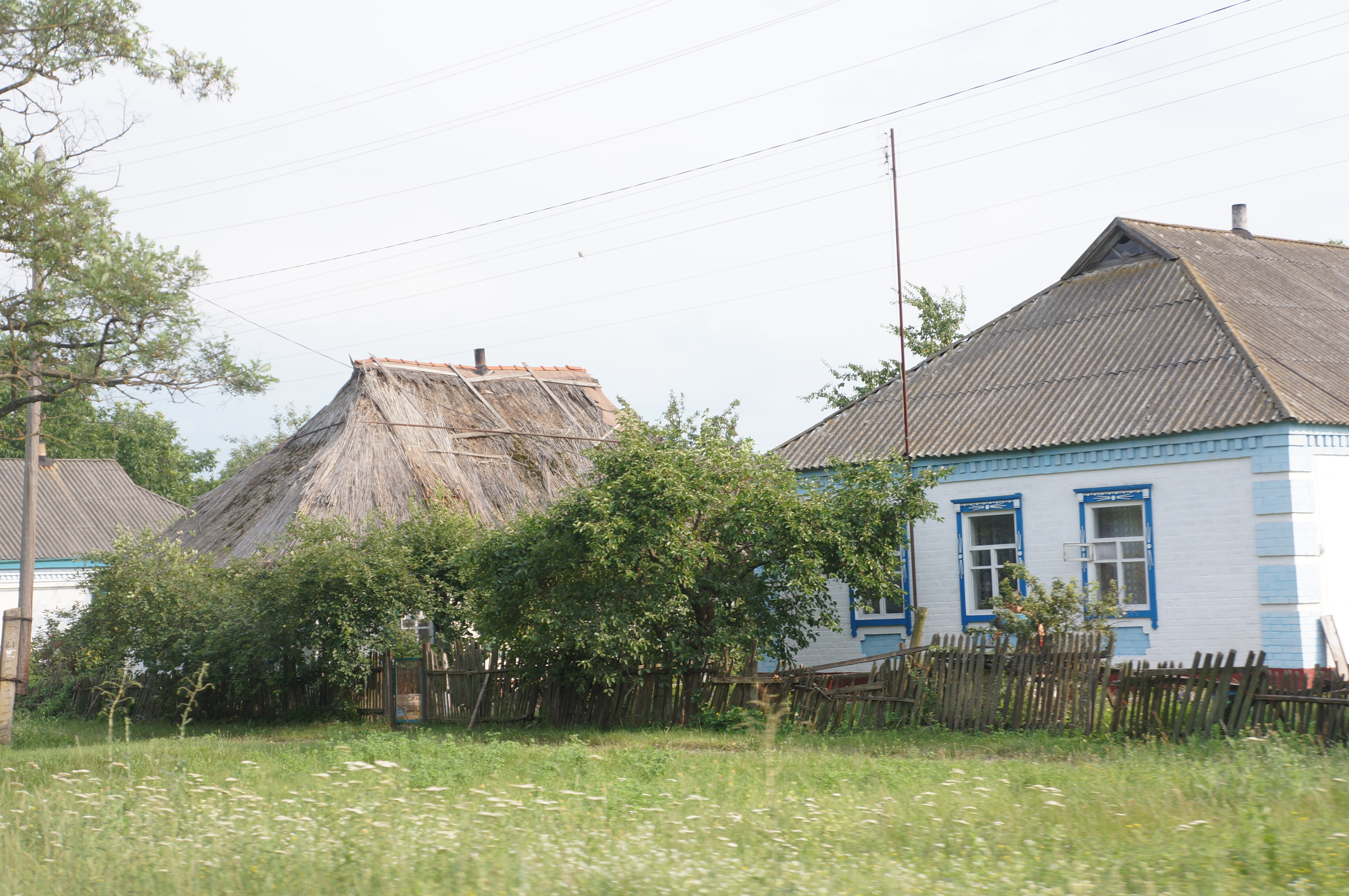
Old buildings in Vyshniaky, Khorol district
