= Tupolev Tu-126 =

Russian airborne early warning and control aircraft

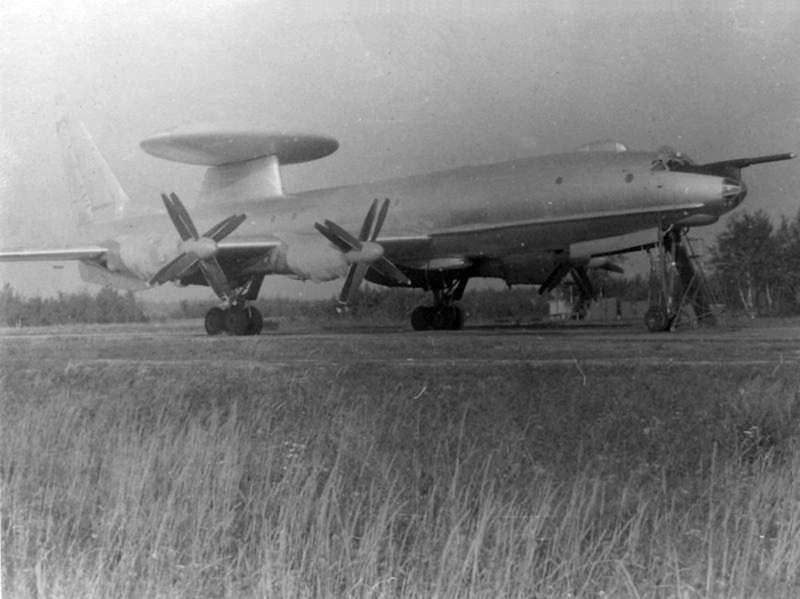
- Tu-126

General information
- Type: Airborne early warning and control
- Manufacturer: Tupolev OKB
- Status: Retired
- Primary user: Soviet Air Force
- Number built: about 12

History
- Introduction date: 1965
- First flight: 23 January 1962
- Retired: 1984 (USSR)
- Developed from: Tupolev Tu-114

The Tupolev Tu-126 (NATO reporting name: Moss) was an airborne early warning and control aircraft developed from the Tupolev Tu-114 airliner by the Tupolev design bureau. It was in service with the armed forces of the Soviet Union from 1965 to 1984.

== Design and development ==
In 1958 increasing concern over the threat of an American nuclear strike against the USSR from the north led to a new requirement for an airborne radar system, which would avoid the problems and expense of attempting to create a land-based radar system to cover all of the enormous Soviet northern coast. The Tupolev Design Bureau was ordered to design an AEW&C aircraft. After trying to fit the projected radar instrumentation in a Tu-95 and a Tu-116, a decision was made to use the Tupolev Tu-114 with its wider fuselage instead. This solved problems with cooling and operator space that existed with the narrower Tu-95 and Tu-116 designs. To adhere to the flight range requirements, the plane was fitted with an air-to-air refuelling probe. The Tu-126 had a crew of 12 and carried the Liana radar (NATO reporting name Flap Jack) in a rotodome mounted above the fuselage. It had no look-down capability, so the switch by NATO to low level penetration made it fairly irrelevant.

The first prototype Tu-126 flew on 23 January 1962. Testing, which continued through the autumn of 1964, showed that while the radar was effective over water, performance was poorer over land. It was also found that the large contra-rotating propellers of the four engines seriously compromised the performance of the radar. This problem was only marginally countered by the installation of a new radar called Shmel.

== Operational history ==
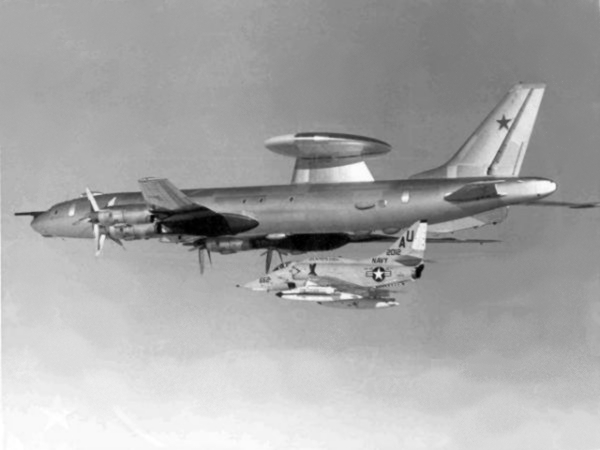
An A-4E from the USS Intrepid intercepting a Tu-126 over the Mediterranean Sea in 1973

The Tu-126 entered service in 1965, although it was only identified by Western intelligence in 1968 after appearing in a Soviet documentary film. Eight production aircraft were built in addition to the prototype from between 1965 and 1968 and all were nominally based at Šiauliai Air Base. Western intelligence estimated that its radar performance was inferior to Western equivalents, that it was unable to detect cruise missiles or small aircraft at low level. However, it was assessed that the Tu-126 had powerful jamming equipment. The Tu-126 was used by the Soviet Air Force, until being replaced by the Beriev A-50. The last Tu-126 was retired in 1984.

== Operators ==
Soviet Union

- Soviet Air Forces
- Soviet Air Defence Forces

Egypt

- Egyptian Air Force

== Specifications (Tu-126) ==
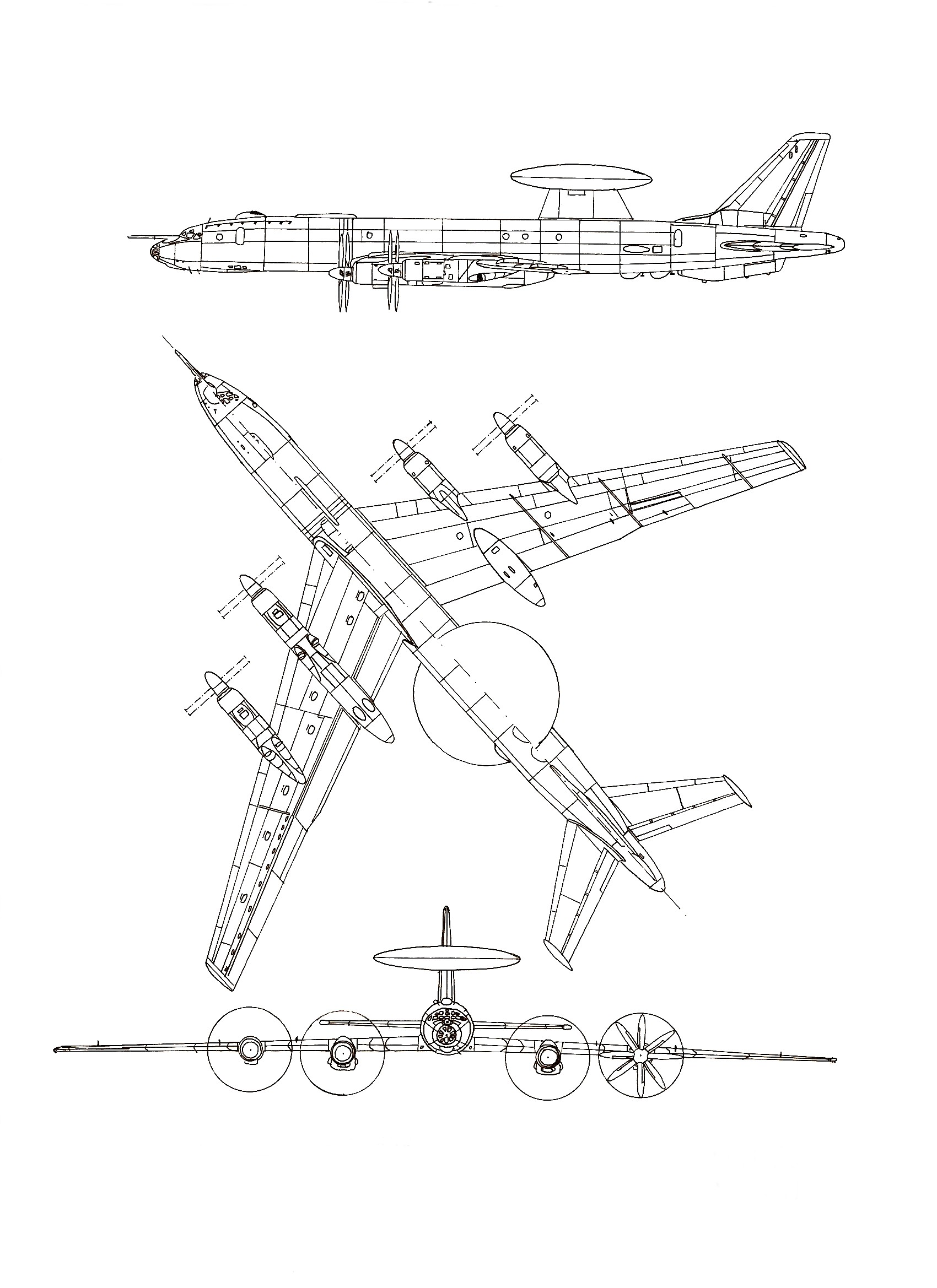

Data from The Osprey Encyclopaedia of Russian Aircraft 1875–1995

General characteristics

- Crew: 12 (plus a full spare crew)
- Length: 56.5 m (185 ft 4 in) with refuelling probe
- Wingspan: 51.4 m (168 ft 8 in)
- Height: 16.05 m (52 ft 8 in)
- Wing area: 311.1 m^{2} (3,349 sq ft)
- Empty weight: 103,000 kg (227,076 lb)
- Gross weight: 171,000 kg (376,990 lb)
- Fuel capacity: 60,800 kg (134,041 lb)
- Powerplant: 4 × Kuznetsov NK-12MV axial flow turboprop engines, 11,033 kW (14,795 hp) each
- Propellers: 8-bladed contra-rotating

Performance

- Maximum speed: 790 km/h (490 mph, 430 kn)
- Cruise speed: 520 km/h (320 mph, 280 kn) at 9,000 m (30,000 ft)
- Range: 7,000 km (4,300 mi, 3,800 nmi) internal fuel only
- Endurance: 20 hours with one in-flight refuel and 10 hours without in-flight refuel
- Service ceiling: 10,700 m (35,100 ft)
- Power/mass: 0.26 kW/kg (0.16 hp/lb)

== See also ==
Related development

- Tupolev Tu-95
- Tupolev Tu-114
- Tupolev Tu-142

Aircraft of comparable role, configuration, and era

- EC-121 Warning Star
