= Flight 65 =

Flight 65 may refer to:

- Aeroflot Flight 65, crashed on 17 February 1966
- Florida Commuter Airlines Flight 65, crashed on September 12, 1980
