= Ulyanovsk Institute of Civil Aviation =

Coordinates: 54.3255923°N 48.3918531°E

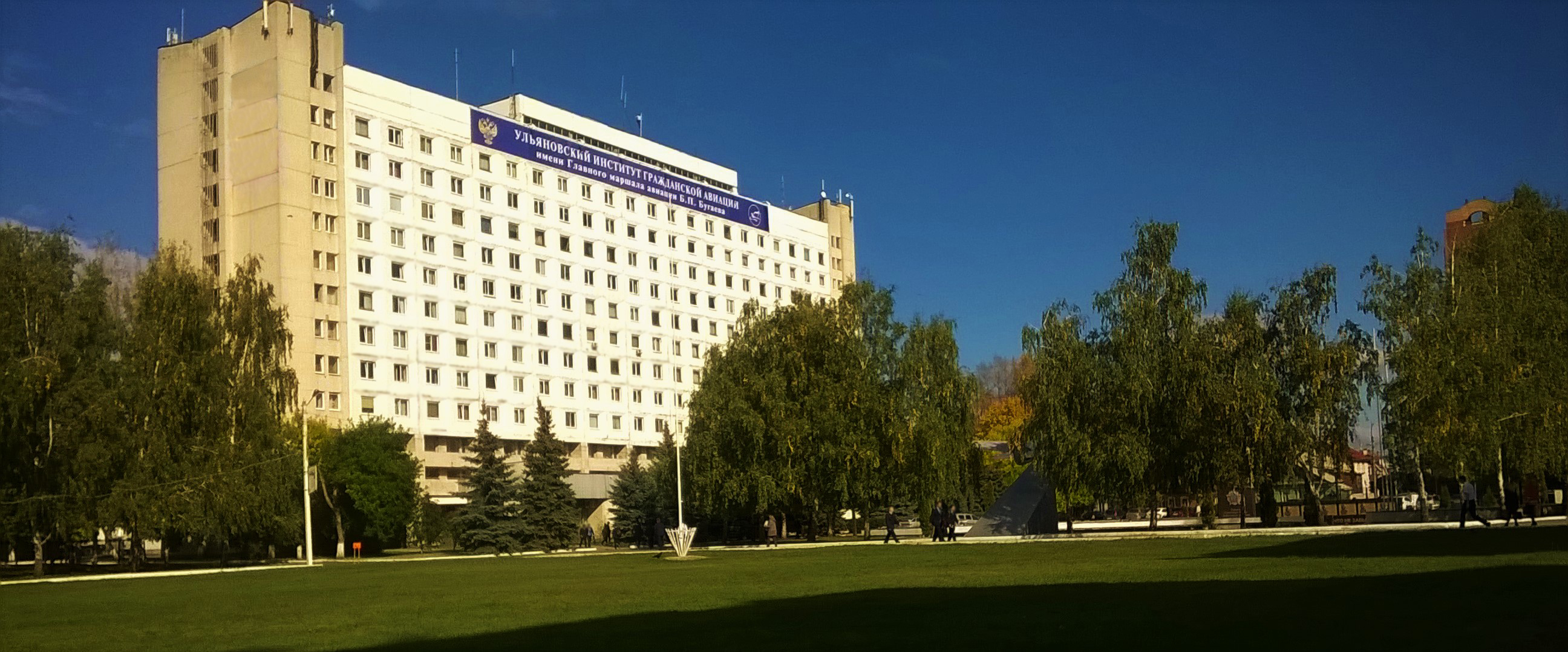
Hotel "Aviation" - main living campus of Ulyanovsk Civil Aviation Institute

The Ulyanovsk Civil Aviation Institute (Russian: Ульяновский институт гражданской авиации) is a state educational institution of higher professional education in Ulyanovsk, Russia.

The right for educational activity in the School is authorised by license №24Г-0299 issued by the Russian Federation Ministry of general and professional education on 1 April 1999 and certificate №25-0790 of state approval granted by the Russian Federation Ministry of Education on 7 December 1999. The School owns Certificate 005 of Federal Aviation Authority of Russia dated by 20 February 2002.

== History ==
The flight school started its activities in 1935 in Bataysk.

In 1939 due to the unsafe international situation, the school moved to Mineralnye Vody, meanwhile Bataysk United school was given to RKKA.

In October 1941 due to World War II, the school was relocated to Tashkent, and its main task became to provide the Red Army with Il-2 pilots. In May 1944 the school came back to Mineralnye Vody, where they continued to train specialists on Il-2 aircraft, and in 1947 they started to train civilian pilots on a new aeroplane, the Il-12.

Also in 1947 the school was renamed from "Higher flight courses"(КВЛП/KVLP) to "Higher flight school"(ШВЛП/ShVLP), which was relocated to Buguruslan in Orenburg Oblast, and later to Ulyanovsk in 1950. In 1955 Il-14 pilot training started, and in 1958 pilot training on An-10 and Il-18, aeroplanes with turboshaft engines began.

In November 1955 the training of foreign pilots started, when specialists from East Germany arrived.Pilots, flight-engineers, flight-radio operators from GDR, Bulgaria, Romania and Hungary were trained on the Il-14. When aeroplanes with turboprop engines Il-18 and An-10 arrived, training of pilots from Guinea, Mali and Ghana started as well.

In December 1974 it was decided to create "Comecon Civil Aviation Centre"(Центр ГА СЭВ). Firstly it was decided to build Training Laboratories, an Aviation Training Centre and a Hotel. On the next turn it was planned to build a Medical Centre, Gym, Swimming Pool, etc. In the beginning of 1983 the building of the Centre's main objectives was completed.

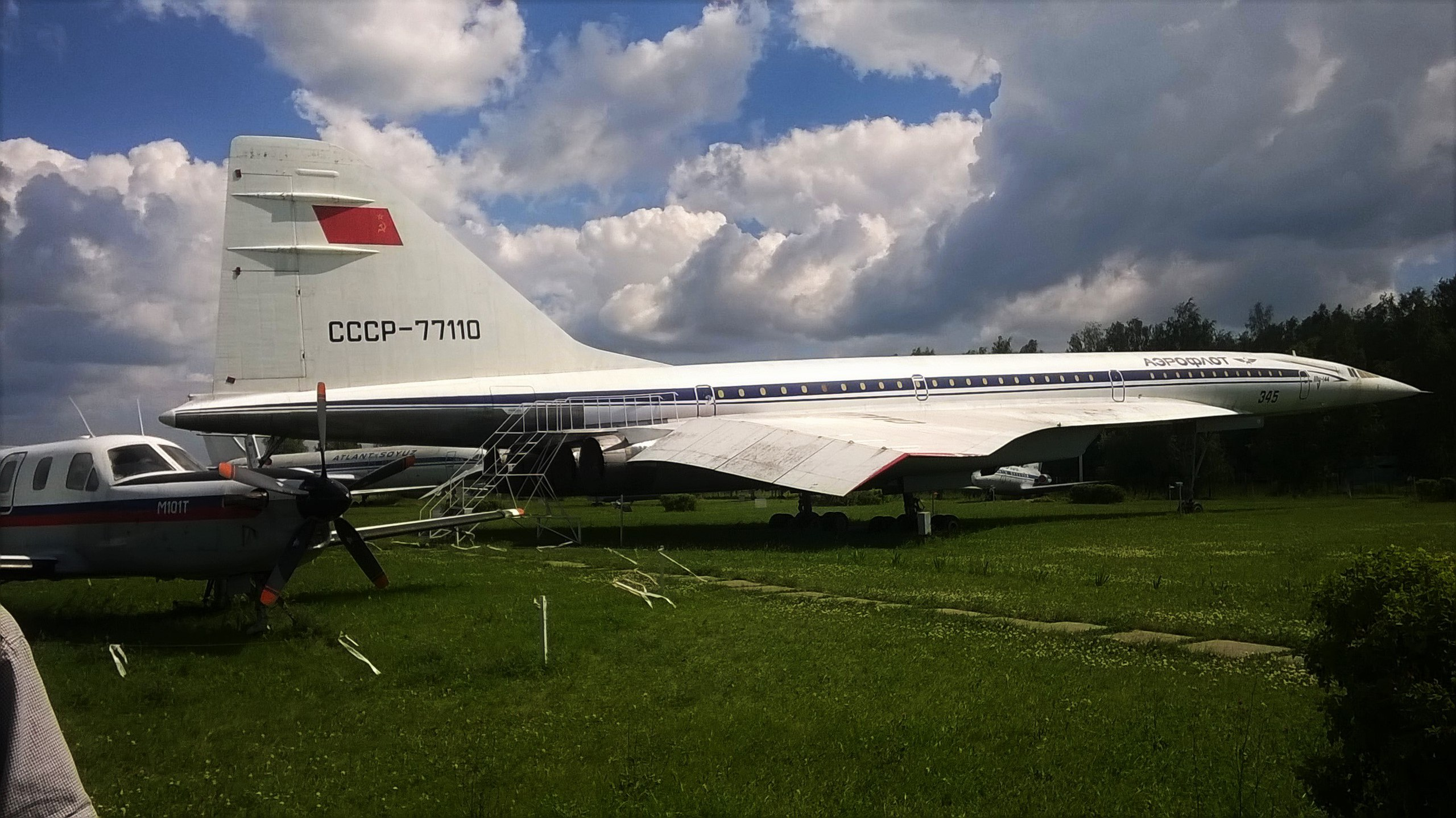
Tupolev 144 at the Museum of Civil Aviation of the USSR

In this period Il-62, Il-76, Il-86 and Yak-42 pilot training started. From 1980 to 1985 more than 15 thousand aviation specialists from 40 countries were trained. In 1985 when the Civil Aviation Centre of Comecon was celebrating its 50th anniversary, it was awarded with the Order of Friendship of Peoples.

In 1983 The Museum of Civil Aviation of the USSR was organised in Comecon Civil Aviation Centre.

Due to the USSR's demise, Higher Civil Aviation schools based in Aktobe and Kirovograd were left outside Russia. As the result there was a problem of air crew training with higher professional education for the airlines of Russia. To solve that problem, in October 1992 it was decided to reform "Comecon Civil Aviation Centre" into the "Ulyanovsk Higher Civil Aviation School".

In 1998 the first "pilots-engineers" and "air traffic controllers-engineers" graduated from UHCAS. In February 2013 there were 1030 cadet-pilots studying. 137 pilots graduated in 2013, and in 2014 the figure was 188 pilots.

On 14 January 2016, "Ulyanovsk Higher Civil Aviation School" was renamed the "Ulyanovsk Civil Aviation Institute", named after Air Chief Marshal Boris Pavlovich Bugaev.

== Available specialities ==
The Institute provides specialist training in accordance with higher professional education curricula based on the requirements of State educational standards of the Russian Federation. The following specialities are available:

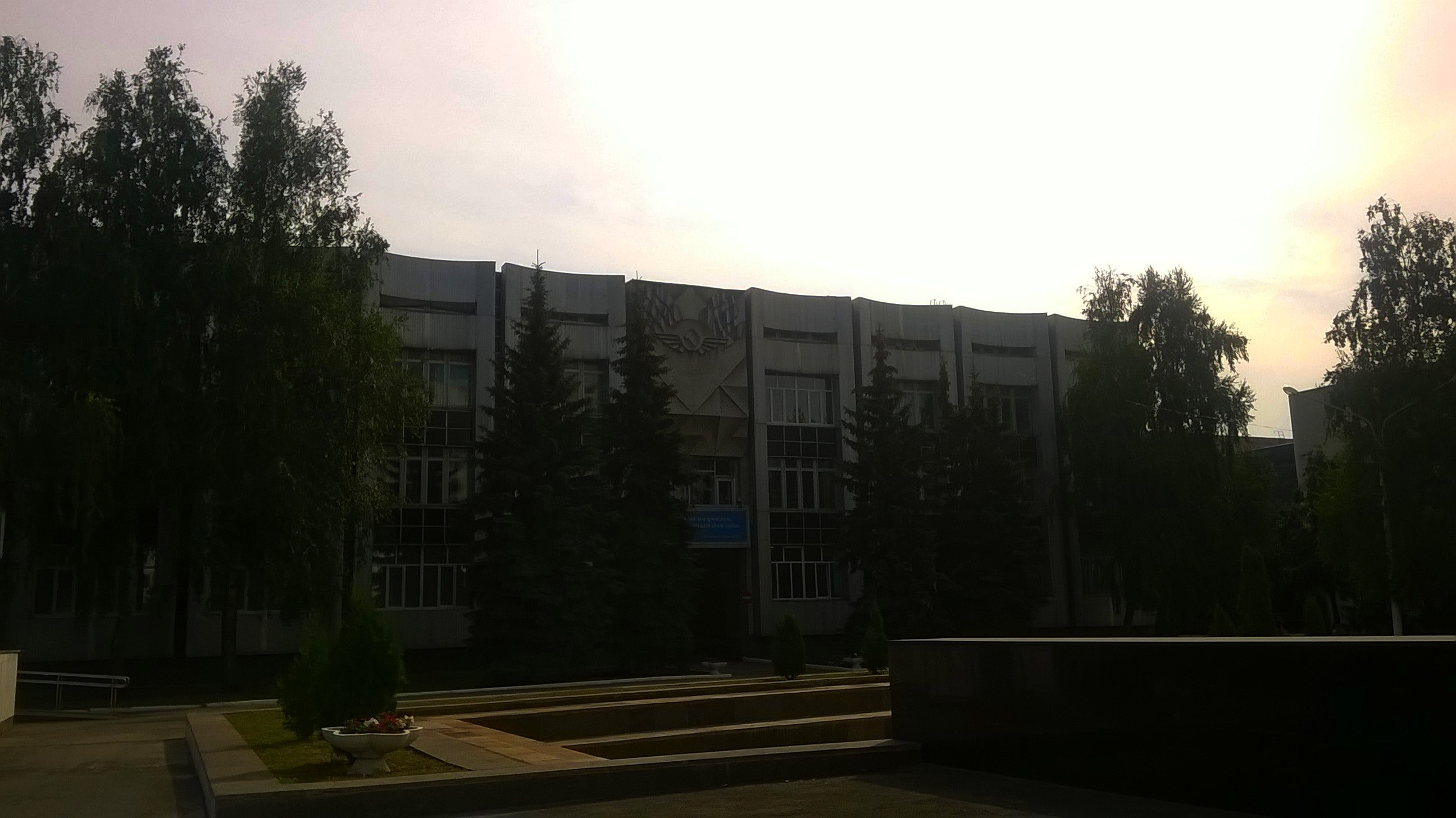
Main learning campus of Ulyanovsk Civil Aviation Institute

- Civil Aviation pilot with qualification
- Air Traffic controller with qualification “engineer”
- Search-and-Rescue specialist of CA with qualification “engineer-bachelor”
- Flight Safety specialist with qualification "engineer-bachelor"
- Quality control specialist
- Safety of technological processes specialist
- Aircraft fuel and refueling specialist

== Simulator Training Centre ==
Simulator Training Centre is structural unit of Ulyanovsk Civil Aviation Institute, formed in 2004. Based on Department of Qualification Increasing and Retraining of aviation specialists.

It includes following full flight simulators:

- FNPT Boeing-737NG
- FFS A320
- FNPT SSJ 100
- FNPT DA40, DA42
- FNPT C-172
- KTS Tu-204
- KTS Yak-18T

== Flight practice ==
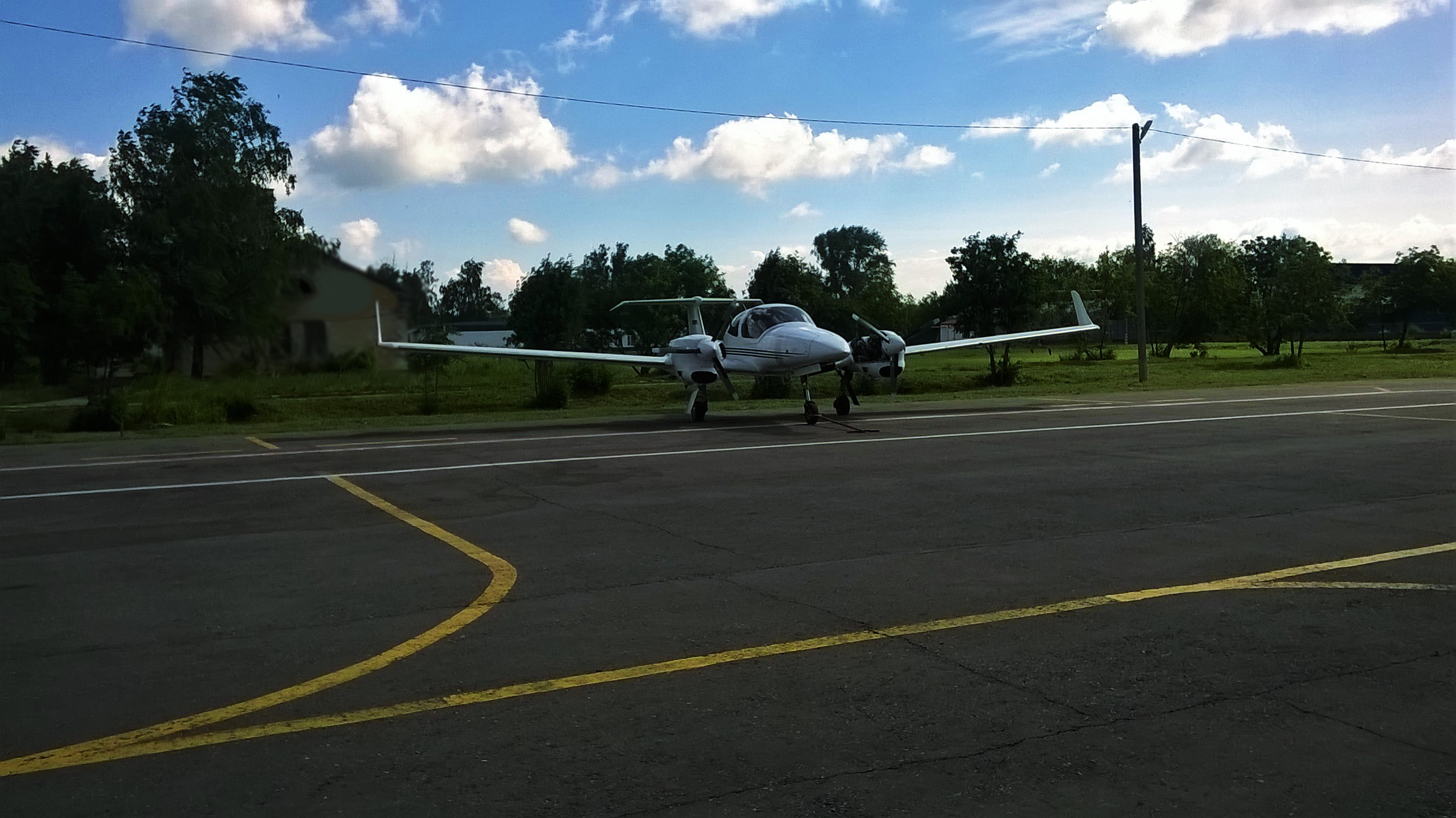
Da-42 standing at Ulyanovsk Barataevka Airport (UWLL)

Nowadays Ulyanovsk Civil Aviation Institute uses a DA40 aircraft for primary flight training as a single-engine aeroplane, and a DA42 for secondary flight training as a multi-engine aeroplane.
