= Tupolev Tu-114 =

Soviet long-range turboprop airliner

Tu-114 Rossiya
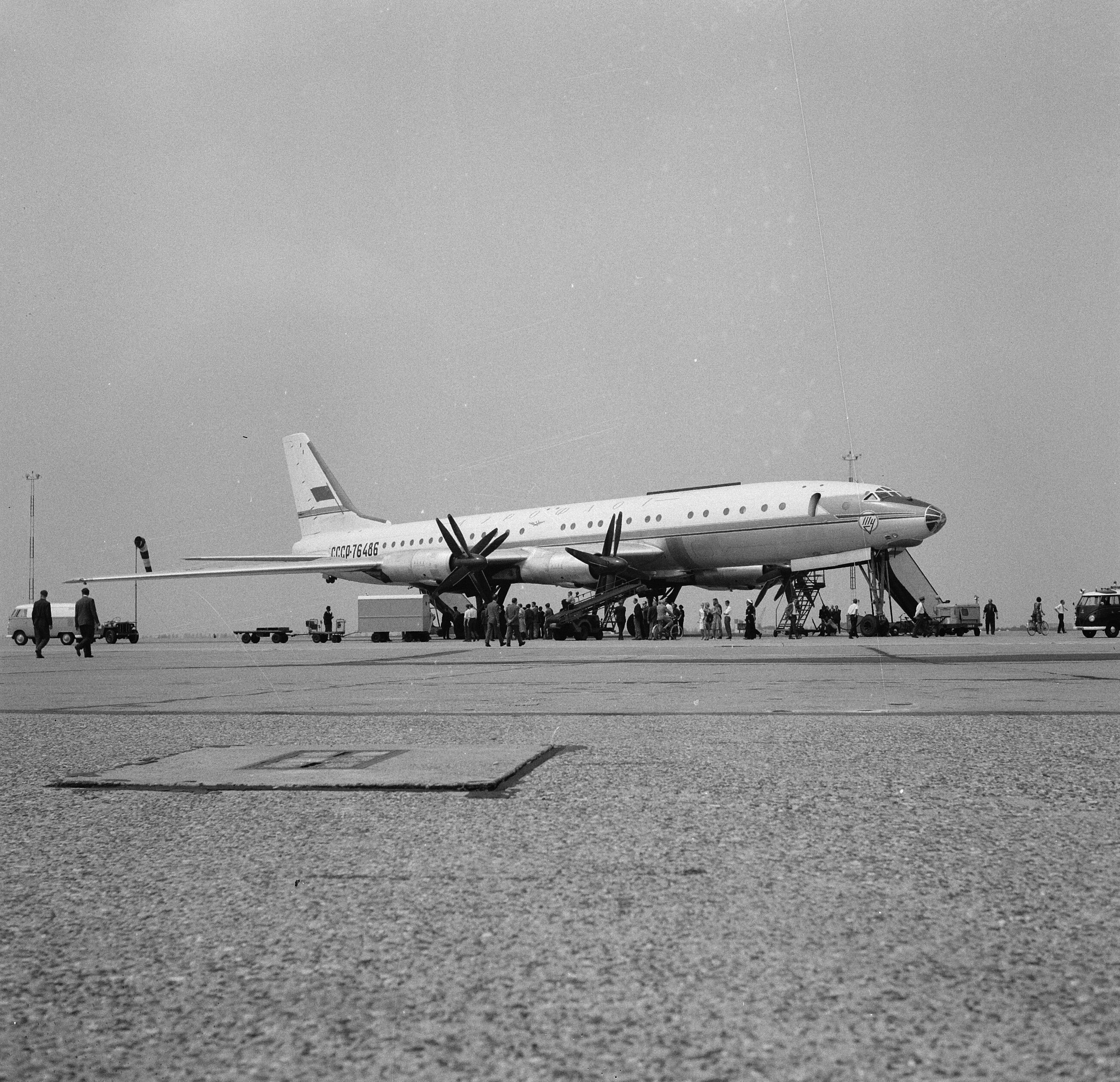
- Aeroflot Tu-114 at Schiphol Airport in 1964

General information
- Type: Large turboprop airliner
- Manufacturer: Tupolev OKB
- Status: Retired
- Primary users: Aeroflot Japan Airlines (in association with Aeroflot); Soviet Air Forces
- Number built: 32

History
- Manufactured: 1958–1963
- Introduction date: 24 April 1961
- First flight: 15 November 1957; 68 years ago
- Retired: 1977
- Developed from: Tupolev Tu-95
- Variant: Tupolev Tu-126

The Tupolev Tu-114 Rossiya (Russian: Tyполев Тy-114 Poccия; NATO reporting name Cleat) is a retired large turboprop-powered long-range airliner designed by the Tupolev design bureau and built in the Soviet Union from May 1955. The aircraft was the largest and fastest passenger plane at that time and also had the longest range, at 10,900 km (6,800 mi). It has held the official title of fastest propeller-driven aircraft since 1960.

Due to its swept wing and powerplant design, the Tu-114 was able to travel at speeds typical of modern jetliners, 880 km/h (550 mph). Although it was able to accommodate 224 passengers, when operated by Aeroflot, it was more common to accommodate 170 passengers with sleeping berths and a dining lounge.

The Tu-114 carried over six million passengers before being replaced by the jet-powered Ilyushin Il-62. Thirty-two aircraft were built at the Kuibyshev aviation plant (No.18) in the early 1960s.

== Development ==
In response to a directive No.1561-868 from the Council of Ministers and Ministry of Aircraft Production order No.571, issued in August 1955, the Tupolev Design Bureau was to create an airliner that had a range of 8,000 km (4,971 mi), based on the Tupolev Tu-95 strategic bomber, powered by four Kuznetsov NK-12 engines driving contra-rotating propellers.

The Tu-114 used the basic wing, empennage, landing gear, and powerplants of the Tu-95 bomber, mated to a totally new pressurized fuselage of much larger diameter. To cope with the increased weight, increased landing flap surface area was required, and the flap chord was increased compared to the bomber's flaps. The wing was mounted low on the fuselage, giving the Tu-114 a much higher stance on its landing gear than the bomber. As a result, a new nose landing gear strut was required, although the main landing gear remained unchanged.

The Tu-114 was able to reach speeds typical of modern jetliners (880 km/h), but its cruising speed equivalent to Mach 0.71 was markedly lower than equivalent jet airliners such as the Boeing 707, Douglas DC-8, and Vickers VC10, which usually cruised at Mach 0.83. It carried up to 224 passengers in maximum carriage configuration, although a more usual number for long-distance transcontinental flights was 170 passengers, which enabled the planes to be fitted with such luxuries as sleeping berths and even a dining lounge for the upper-class cabin.

== Design ==
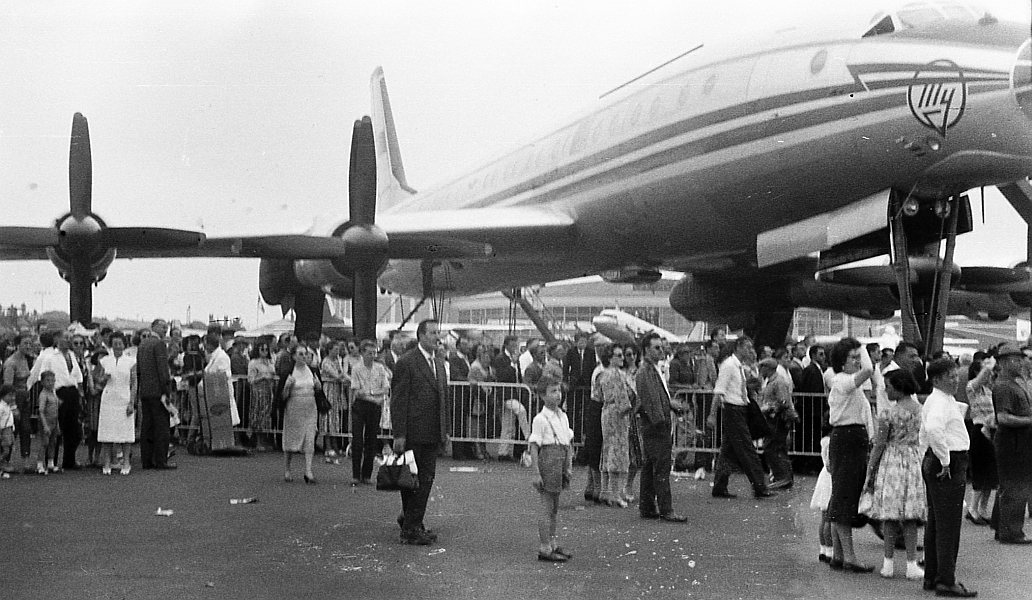
Tu-114 at the Paris Air Show, 1961

The Tu-114 had several unique features for its time, such as:

- Wings swept back at 35 degrees — the same angle as for the Boeing 707 and several other pure turbojet-powered airliners
- The most powerful turboprop engines to enter service on any aircraft, the Kuznetsov NK-12MV, each driving two AV-60H, contra-rotating, four-bladed, reversible-pitch propellers.
- Lower deck galleys. A dumbwaiter connected the galley to the upper deck; originally, a member of the crew was a chef.
- Lower deck aircrew rest area.
- Long landing gear (the nose gear was 3 meters high) due to a combination of a low wing and its large propeller diameter. Many destination airports did not have steps tall enough to reach the Tu-114's cabin door because of this.

The Tu-114s was a rare example of a plane with a dual-use layout — as a commercial airliner and for government transportation. The same dual-purpose layout was used in the first Tu-104s. The Tu-114 had four sleeping compartments with three berths in each, and a "restaurant" cabin in the midsection of the aircraft — the loudest section on the aircraft — with eight tables, each of which had six seats in a face-to-face arrangement. During official flights the middle cabin was used as a restaurant for dining. VIPs like Nikita Khrushchev and his wife travelled in the sleeping compartments, with their staff and entourage in two tourist class cabins with 3+3 layout. Front cabins had 41 seats (first row 2+3), and the aft cabin had 54 seats.

On domestic flights all seats were sold at one price; there was no class difference in the USSR during the Tu-114's flying career. The most uncomfortable places on the plane were in the "restaurant" compartments (six seats instead of three sleeping berths), these were sold last. Three places in row 16, near the stair to the lower deck were equipped with baby bassinets. Maximum seating capacity of the Tu-114 in its "native" configuration was 170 passengers.

For international flights, sleeping places were sold as first class. In the early 1970s, sleeping compartments and the "restaurant" on most Tu-114s (excluding three or four) were dismantled and replaced with the usual passenger seats, with maximum seating reaching 200.

The design was not without shortcomings. Passengers on the Tu-114 endured high noise levels (108–112 dB) and vibrations from the propellers and engines.

== Operational history ==
Video of a Tu-114 landing at Amsterdam Airport Schiphol in 1964

The first Tu-114, registration CCCP-Л5611 (typically rendered as CCCP-L5611 in western/roman script), was first shown to the West in 1958 at the Brussels World Exhibition. It later carried Nikita Khrushchev on his first trip to the United States in September 1959, the first such visit by any Soviet leader. The Tu-114 was still in the testing phase and had completed its first long range flight only four months earlier, after which postflight analysis found that hairline cracks had formed in the engines. Trusting the Soviet leadership to a still experimental aircraft was risky, but the only other option for a flight to the United States would be the short range Il-18 which would require multiple fueling stops. Although the Central Committee, Minister of Defense Malinovsky, and Khrushchev's personal pilot all considered it too risky to use the new aircraft, the Soviet premier insisted and aircraft designer Andrei Tupolev felt confident enough to put his son Alexei on the same flight. During Khrushchev's flight, a group of engineers were aboard the plane, operating diagnostic equipment to monitor the engines and verify that they were functioning correctly. Khrushchev later said, "We didn't publicize the fact that Tupolev's son was with us" for "to do so, would have meant giving explanations, and these might have been damaging to our image". When it arrived at Andrews Air Force Base, the ground crew found that the aircraft was so large and its landing gear so tall that they had no passenger steps high enough to reach the forward hatch. Khrushchev and his party were obliged to use the aircraft's own emergency escape ladder. The last flight of this particular plane was in 1968, and it is now on display at the Central Air Force Museum at Monino, outside of Moscow. Similar issues were experienced when the plane first landed at London and Paris airports, neither of which had hosted a plane of this size.

The Tu-114 entered regular Aeroflot service on flights from Vnukovo Airport in Moscow to Khabarovsk on 24 April 1961. It was subsequently used for Aeroflot flights to international destinations including Copenhagen, Havana, Montreal, New Delhi, Paris, Belgrade and Tokyo (in co-operation with JAL).

Flights to Havana via Conakry in Guinea began on 10 July 1962. After the United States government placed political pressure on Guinea, landing rights were denied after four flights, and the Tu-114 service had to be routed through Dakar, Senegal, instead. Further American pressure to isolate Cuba resulted in denial of landing rights after three flights, and the route was changed to Algiers, Algeria, instead. After three more flights, Algiers was also closed to the Tu-114. To overcome this, the Tu-114 was specially modified into the long-range Tu-114D variant, with seating reduced from 170 to 60, and 15 extra fuel tanks added. These aircraft refuelled at Olenya near Murmansk, in the far North of the Soviet Union, and then flew via the Barents Sea to Havana. Usually, this fuel load was enough, but in case of strong headwinds, an emergency refuelling stop in Nassau in The Bahamas was necessary; this was an American military field. All planes operating this route were converted back to normal specifications after the jet-powered Ilyushin Il-62 began flying the Moscow–Havana route.

Aeroflot first appeared in the OAG registry in the January 1967 issue, which shows:

- a weekly Tu-114 from Sheremetyevo to Montreal, scheduled 11 hours 50 minutes (YUL to SVO was 10:30)
- two weekly Tu-114s to Havana in 19:20, returning in 16:25
- one weekly Tu-114 to Delhi in 7:00, returning in 7:40

The May 1967 OAG adds the weekly flight to Tokyo, taking 10:35 hours and the return to SVO in 11:25 hours.

Ilyushin 62s took over the Delhi and Montreal flights in 1967 (though the August 1968 OAG shows a weekly SVO-YUL-HAV Tu-114 along with a weekly Tu-114 via Algiers). Ilyushins took over the Tokyo flight in May/June 1969 and Havana, probably sometime in 1969.

With the increasing use of the Il-62, the Tu-114s were shifted to long domestic flights from Domodedovo to Alma-Ata, Tashkent, Novosibirsk and Khabarovsk. Tu-114s were also used for charter operations for senior officials of the USSR and various official delegations.

The Tu-114 had a short commercial service life compared with other Soviet airliners, being operated on regular flights from 1961 to 1976 (in comparison, the Il-62 is still in civilian service 52 years after its introduction, as of 2019). The fatigue life of the airframe was set at 14,000 flying hours. Most of the aircraft passed this point in 1976. By the summer of 1977, Aeroflot decided to scrap 21 aircraft at the same time. A few continued in use by the Soviet Air Forces until 1991.

Although the time in service was relatively brief, the Tu-114, during its time in service, managed to earn an excellent reputation for reliability, speed and fuel economy. Tu-114 burned 5,000-5,500 kg/hour of fuel at cruise flight, which is comparable to a modern wide-body twinjet, such as a Boeing 787 Dreamliner or Airbus A350 XWB. Its safety record was rarely matched: there was only one accident involving fatalities, but the plane was not airborne at the time. It was only withdrawn from service after the introduction of the Il-62 and after carrying over six million passengers with Aeroflot and Japan Airlines.

=== JAL service ===
For the Moscow–Tokyo route, Japan Air Lines made an agreement with Aeroflot to use the Tu-114. The flight crew included one JAL member, and the cabin crew consisted of five each from Aeroflot and JAL. The seating was changed to a two-class layout with 105 seats, and the aircraft livery included a small JAL logo and lettering on the forward fuselage. The first flight was on April 17, 1967. In 1969, the Moscow–Tokyo Tu-114 flights ended and the four involved planes converted back to the 200-seat domestic layout.

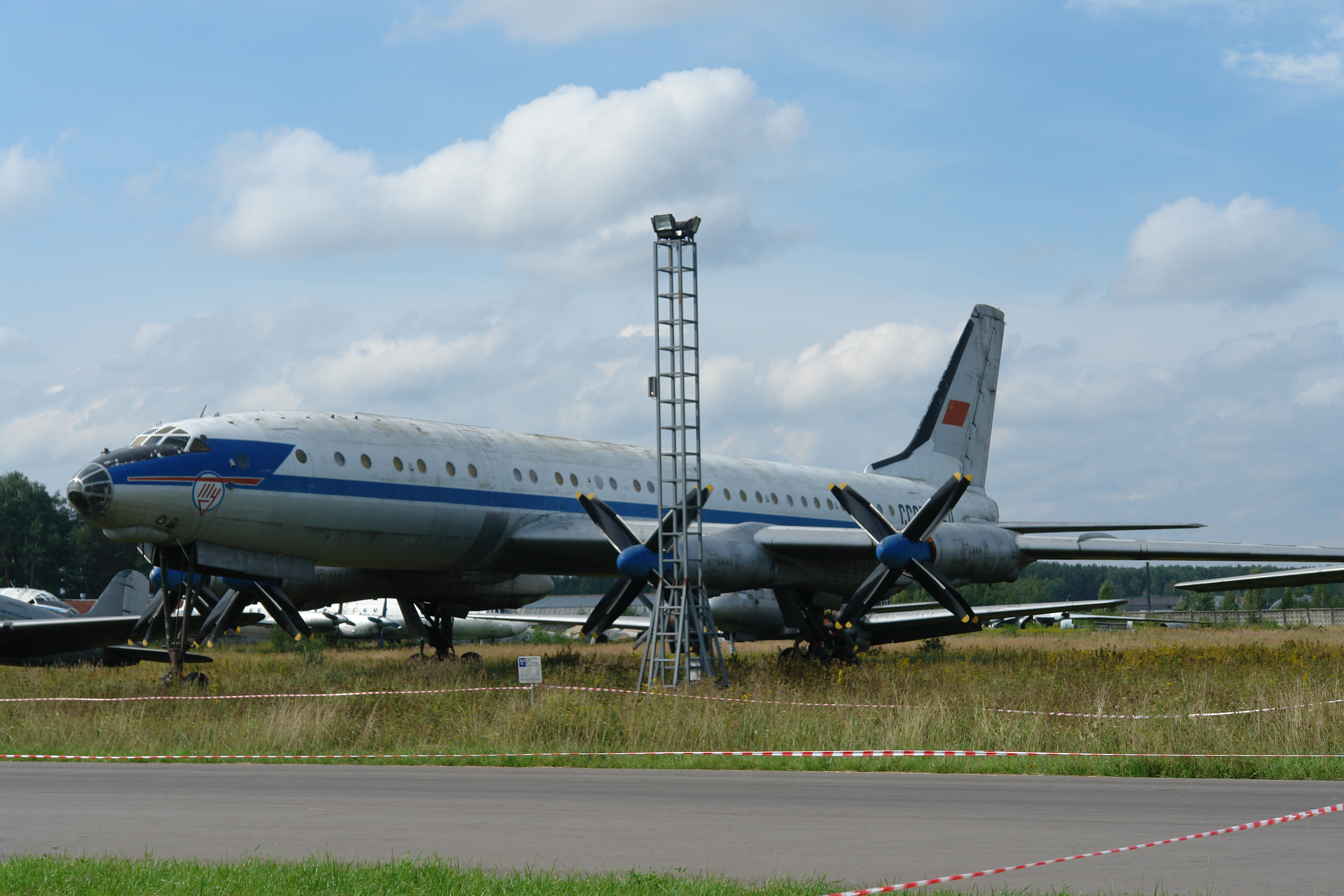
Tu-114 at Monino Museum.

=== World records ===
In June 1959 the Aviation Sports Committee of the Central Air Club named after Valeriy P. Chkalov approached the Tupolev OKB suggesting that various aviation records could be taken by Tupolev-designed aircraft. The Tupolev OKB prepared a detailed plan for record attempts on the Tu-16, Tu-104, Tu-104B, Tu-95M and Tu-114. The second preproduction Tu-114 (CCCP-76459) was prepared and clearance obtained to fly with the 30-tonne (metric ton) payload required for some of the record attempts.

In a series of flights beginning on 24 March 1960 the Tu-114 achieved the following records in Sub-class C-1 (landplanes) Group 2 (turboprop):

24 March 1960
Maximum speed on a 1,000 km (621 mi) closed circuit with payloads of 0 to 25,000 kg (0 to 55,116 lb)
Pilot: Ivan Sukhomlin (USSR)
Captain: B. Timochuk + 4 other crew
Course/place: Sternberg Astronomical Institute
- 871.38 km/h (541.45 mph)

1 April 1960
Maximum speed on a 2,000 km (1,240 mi) closed circuit with payloads of 0 to 25,000 kg (0 to 55,116 lb)
Pilot: Ivan Sukhomlin (USSR)
2nd pilot: N. Kharitonov + 3 other crew
Course/place: Sternberg-Point Observatory (USSR)
Tu-114 '76459'
- 857.277 km/h (532.687 mph)

9 April 1960
Maximum speed on a 5,000 km (3,110 mi) closed circuit with payloads of 0 to 25,000 kg (0 to 55,116 lb)
Pilot: Ivan Sukhomlin (USSR)
2nd pilot: Konstantin Sapelkin (2nd pilot)
Course/place: Sternberg-Point Observatory (USSR)
Tu-114 '76459'
- 857.212 km/h (532.647 mph)

12 July 1961
Altitude with payloads of 25,000 to 30,000 kg (55,100 to 66,100 lb)
Pilot: Ivan Sukhomlin (USSR)
2nd pilot: Piotr Soldatov
Course/place: Vnukovo (USSR)
- 12,073 m (39,610 ft)

21 April 1962
Maximum speed on a 10,000 km (6,210 mi) closed circuit with payloads of 1,000 to 10,000 kg (2,200 to 22,000 lb)
Pilot: Ivan Sukhomlin (USSR)
2nd pilot: P. Soldatov
Course/place: Sternberg-Point Observatory (USSR)
Tu-114 '76467'
- 737.352 km/h (458.169 mph)

All these records stand, but the category was discontinued when the category was split into takeoff weight sub-groups. Similar records have been set in the new sub-groups by Tu-95 and Tu-142 aircraft at faster speeds.

== Variants ==
- Tu-114 — initial production version
- Tu-114 6NK-8 — projected long-range version with six Kuznetsov NK-8 turbofan engines. Destined as an alternative to the Il-62M; never reached production.
- Tu-114-200 — upgrade to original Tu-114, with seating layout for 200 passengers. Almost all aircraft were converted.
- Tu-114A — projected upgraded version designed in 1962–1963, with 98–102 passengers on long-range routes; never entered production
- Tu-114B — variant of Tu-114A with radome and assigned to carry large cruise missile
- Tu-114C — variant of Tu-114A with radome from Tu-114B and side blisters
- Tu-114D — (Dalniy, "long-range") long-range version for flights to Cuba, with fewer passengers and increased take-off weight to 182,000 kg. Three built; two were converted to Tu-114-200 standard in 1969–1970 and one was written off in 1962. Not to be confused with the Tu-116 (Tu-114D).
- Tu-114E — reconnaissance version of Tu-114A
- Tu-114F — reconnaissance version of Tu-114A and Tu-114E with additional sensors
- Tu-114PLO — projected maritime strike variant armed with anti-ship missiles and naval radar. This variant was to be powered by a nuclear powerplant.
- Tu-114T — projected cargo freighter version, featuring a swing-tail for loading large cargo.
- Tu-115 — projected military transport version with a rear loading ramp and armed with a rear gun turret. Behind the cockpit was a compartment for 38 soldiers. The Tu-115 was designed to transport 300 paratroopers or 40 tons of cargo for a distance of 5,000 km (3,100 mi). Cancelled in favor of the Antonov An-22.

=== Related developments ===
==== Tu-116 ====
The Tu-116 was a Tupolev Tu-95 bomber fitted with pressurized passenger cabins built to serve as the official government transport. The two passenger cabins were fitted into the space of bomb bays and were not connected to each other or the flight deck.

==== Tu-126 ====
The Tu-126 (NATO reporting name Moss) was used by the Soviet Air Force in the airborne early warning (AEW) role until being replaced by the Beriev A-50.

== Operators ==
=== Civil ===
==== Japan ====
- Japan Airlines – In association with Aeroflot.

==== Soviet Union ====
- Aeroflot

=== Military ===
==== Soviet Union ====
- Soviet Air Forces (Tu-114, Tu-116)

== Accidents and incidents ==
During its service life, the Tu-114 had only one fatal accident. On 17 February 1966, Aeroflot Flight 065 attempted to take off from Moscow Sheremetyevo Airport at night in deteriorating weather conditions, after the flight had been delayed several times. The crew was unaware that snow had not been properly cleared from the full width of the runway involved. The plane's wing struck a large snow mound at speed and the propellers of the number 3 and 4 engines hit the runway, resulting in the aircraft veering off course and catching fire. Initial Soviet sources suggested that 48 of the 70 persons on board were killed, including the pilot. The aircraft was bound for Brazzaville, Republic of the Congo with a number of Africans and a Soviet trade delegation on board. Later reports give the fatalities as 21 of 66 on board.

Another non-operational aircraft, CCCP-76479 (one of only three Tu-114Ds manufactured), was written off with fuselage damage on 7 August 1962 at Vnukovo Airport after the main landing gear retracted during servicing. The flight engineer failed to check the position of the landing gear lever before switching on power. The aircraft was to be used as a ground instructional airframe by the Kiev Aviation Institute, but this never happened as the aircraft could not be transported from Moscow to Kiev. The fuselage sat at a scrapyard at Vnukovo Airport into the 1980s.

== Aircraft on display ==
Russia

CCCP-L5611 – (Prototype) On static display at the Central Air Force Museum in Monino, Moscow Oblast. This is the airliner used by Nikita Khrushchev when he visited the United States in 1959.

CCCP-76490 – On static display at the Ulyanovsk Aircraft Museum in Ulyanovsk, Ulyanovsk Oblast together with the sole surviving example of the related Tu-116.

Ukraine

CCCP-76485 – On static display at the Aviation Museum of the National Aviation University in Kryvyi Rih.

== Specifications (Tu-114) ==
Data from Jane's all the World's Aircraft 1969–70

General characteristics

- Crew: 5 or 6 flight crew with up to 10 cabin crew
- Capacity: up to 220 pax
- Length: 54.1 m (177 ft 6 in)
- Wingspan: 51.1 m (167 ft 8 in)
- Width: 4.2 m (13 ft 9 in)
- Height: 15.44 m (50 ft 8 in)
- Wing area: 311.1 m^{2} (3,349 sq ft)
- Empty weight: 91,000 kg (200,621 lb)
- Gross weight: 164,000 kg (361,558 lb)
- Max takeoff weight: 171,000 kg (376,990 lb)
- Fuel capacity: 60,000 kg (130,000 lb) / 72,980 L (19,280 US gal; 16,050 imp gal)
- Powerplant: 4 × Kuznetsov NK-12MV turboprop engines, 11,033 kW (14,795 hp) each
- Propellers: 8-bladed AV-60N contra-rotating reversible pitch propellers, 5.6 m (18 ft 4 in) diameter

Performance

- Maximum speed: 870 km/h (540 mph, 470 kn) at 8,000 m (26,000 ft)
- Maximum speed: Mach 0.78 at 8,000 m (26,000 ft)
- Cruise speed: 770 km/h (480 mph, 420 kn) at 9,000 m (30,000 ft)
- Range: 8,950 km (5,560 mi, 4,830 nmi) with max fuel and 15,000 kg (33,000 lb) payload
  6,200 km (3,900 mi; 3,300 nmi) with max payload and 60 minutes fuel reserves
- Service ceiling: 12,000 m (39,000 ft)
- Wing loading: 532 kg/m^{2} (109 lb/sq ft)
- Power/mass: 249 W/kg (0.151 hp/lb)
- Take-off run: 2,500 m (8,200 ft)
- Landing run: 1,400 m (4,600 ft)

== See also ==
Related development

- Tupolev Tu-95
- Tupolev Tu-116
- Tupolev Tu-126
- Tupolev Tu-142

Aircraft of comparable role, configuration, and era

- Bristol Brabazon
- Bristol Britannia
- Ilyushin Il-18
- Lockheed L-188 Electra
- Vickers Vanguard

Related lists

- List of civil aircraft
