= Kuznetsov NK-12 =

1950s Soviet turboprop aircraft engine

NK-12
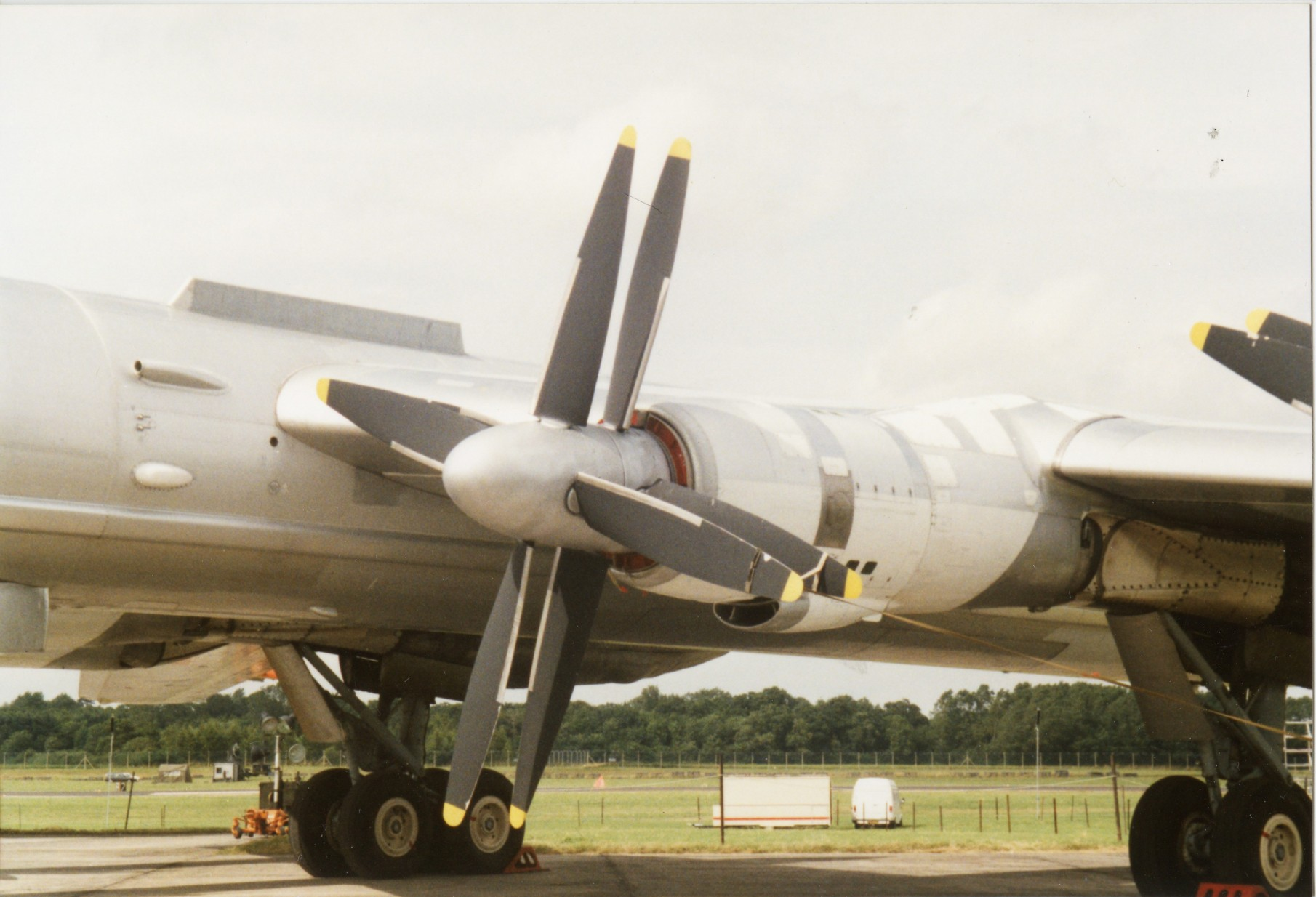
- NK-12M Turboprop engine on a Tu-95 at RIAT Fairford 1993
- Type: Turboprop
- National origin: Soviet Union
- Manufacturer: Kuznetsov Design Bureau
- First run: October 1952
- Major applications: Antonov An-22; Tupolev Tu-95; Tupolev Tu-114; Tupolev Tu-142

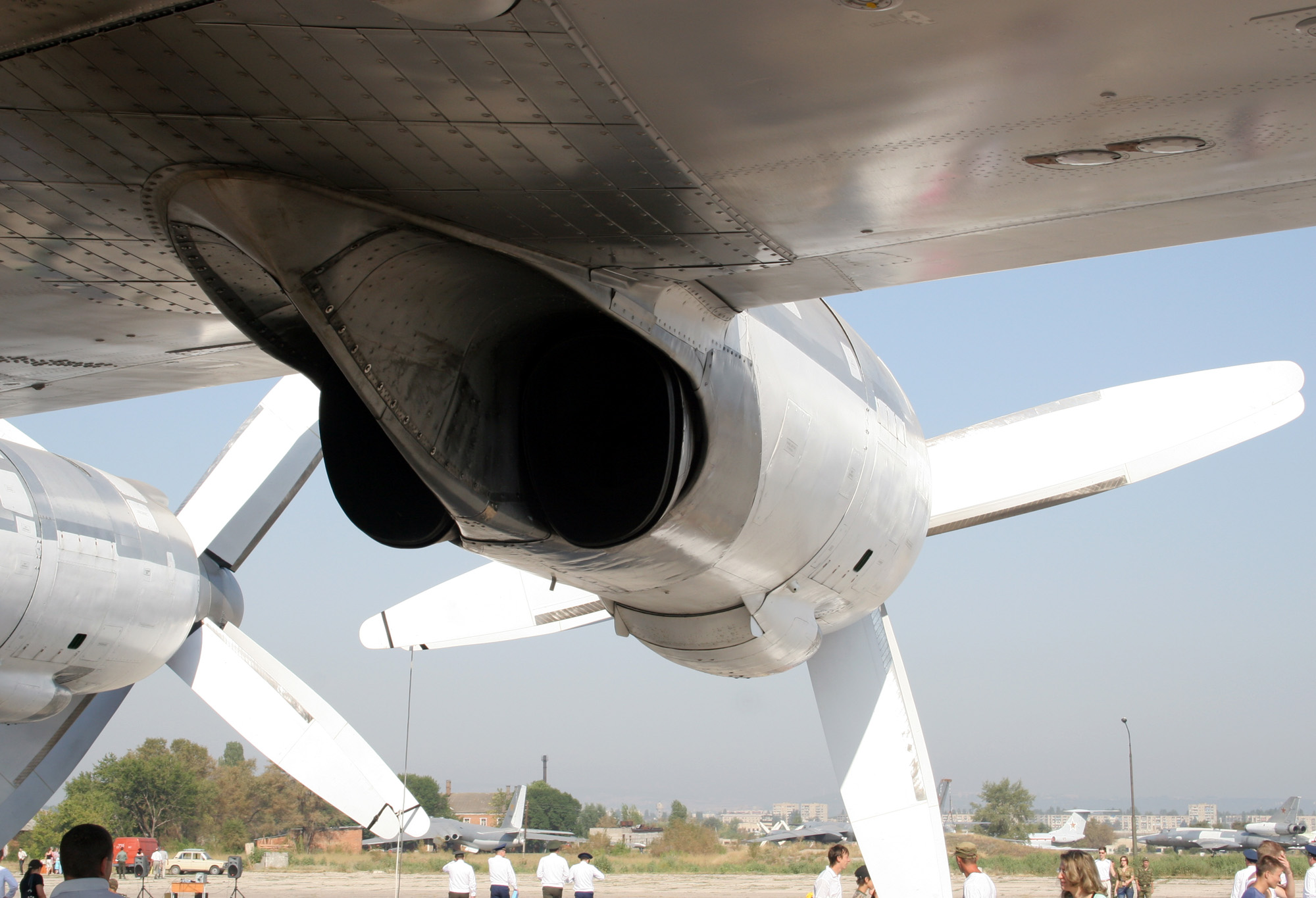
The exhaust ports of a NK-12 in an outboard nacelle on a Tu-95

The Kuznetsov NK-12 is a Soviet turboprop engine of the 1950s, designed by the Kuznetsov design bureau. The NK-12 drives two large four-bladed contra-rotating propellers, 5.6 m (18 ft) diameter (NK-12MA), and 6.2 m (20 ft) diameter (NK-12MV). It is the most powerful turboprop engine to enter service.

== Design and development ==
The design that eventually became the NK-12 turboprop was developed after World War II by a team of Soviet scientists and imprisoned German engineers as part of Operation Osoaviakhim, led by Ferdinand Brandner, who had worked for Junkers previously; the design bureau was headed by chief engineer Nikolai D. Kuznetsov. Thus, the NK-12 design evolved from late-war German turboprop studies. This started with the postwar development of the wartime Jumo 022 turboprop design that was designed to develop 6,000 shp (4,500 kW), weighing 3,000 kg (6,600 lb). The effort continued with a 5,000 shp (3,700 kW), weighing 1,700 kg (3,700 lb), completed by 1947. Evolution to the TV-12 12,000 shp (8,900 kW) engine required extensive use of new Soviet-developed alloys and was completed in 1951.

The NK-12 is the most powerful turboprop engine to enter service, ahead of the Europrop TP400 (in 2005). Another engine of similar size, the Pratt & Whitney T57 with 15,000 shp (11,000 kW) and 5,000 lbf (22 kN) jet thrust, ran 3,100 hours before being cancelled in 1957. The NK-12 powers the Tupolev Tu-95 bomber and its derivatives such as the Tu-142 maritime patrol aircraft and the Tupolev Tu-114 airliner (with NK-12MV), which still holds the title of the world's fastest propeller-driven aircraft despite being retired from service in 1991. It also powered the Antonov An-22 Antei (with NK-12MA), the world's largest aircraft at the time, and several types of amphibious assault craft, such as the A-90 Orlyonok "Ekranoplan".

The engine has a 14-stage axial-flow compressor, producing pressure ratios between 9:1 and 13:1 depending on altitude, with variable inlet guide vanes and blow-off valves for engine operability. The combustion system used is a cannular-type: each flame tube is centrally mounted on a downstream injector that ends in an annular secondary region. The contra-rotating propellers and compressor are driven by the five-stage axial turbine. Mass flow is 65 kg (143 lb) per second.

== Variants ==
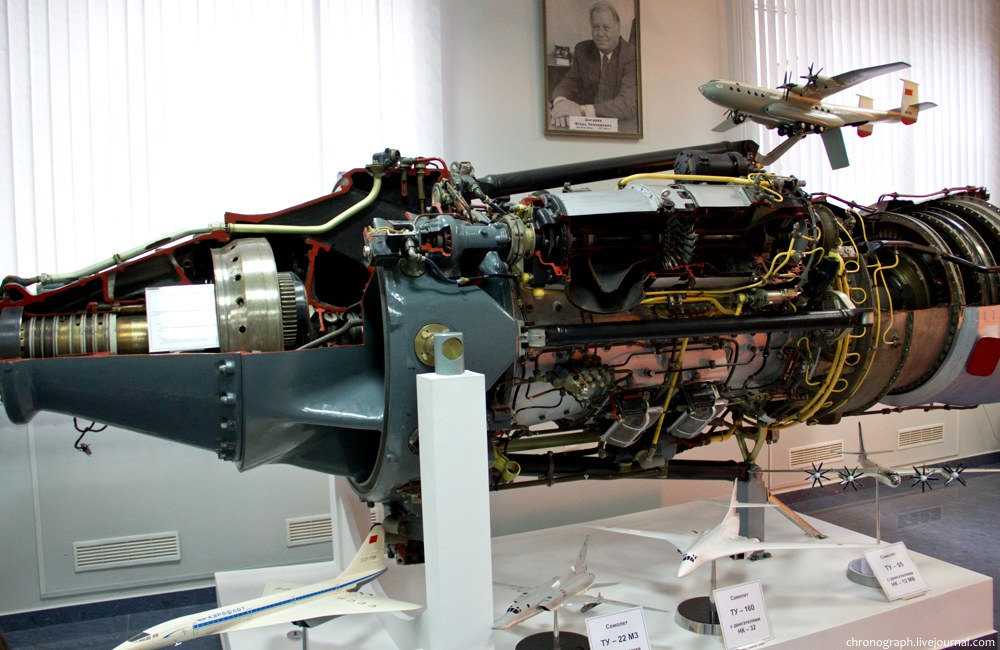
NК-12МV

Data from Alexandrov

NK-12
12,500 hp (9,300 kW), initial development model, used on the Tupolev Tu-95 and Tupolev Tu-116
NK-12M
12,000 hp (8,950 kW), used on the Tupolev Tu-114
NK-12MV
14,795 hp (11,033 kW), 5.6 m diameter (18 ft 4 in; 560 cm; 220 in) AV-60 propellers, used on the Tupolev Tu-95, Tupolev Tu-126, and Tupolev Tu-142
NK-12MA
15,001 hp (11,186 kW), 6.2 m diameter (20 ft 4 in; 620 cm; 244 in) AV-90 propellers, used on the Antonov An-22
NK-12MK
14,795 hp (11,033 kW), 5.6 m diameter (18 ft 4 in; 560 cm; 220 in) propellers, built with corrosion-resistant materials, used on the A-90 Orlyonok
NK-12MP
14,795 hp (11,033 kW), modernized version used on the Tupolev Tu-95MS and Tupolev Tu-142M
NK-12MPM
Upgraded version of the NK-12MP that develops more power, produces half the vibration and is paired with the Aerosila AV-60T propeller; replaces the NK-12MP engine and AV-60K propeller on the Tupolev Tu-95MS

== Applications ==
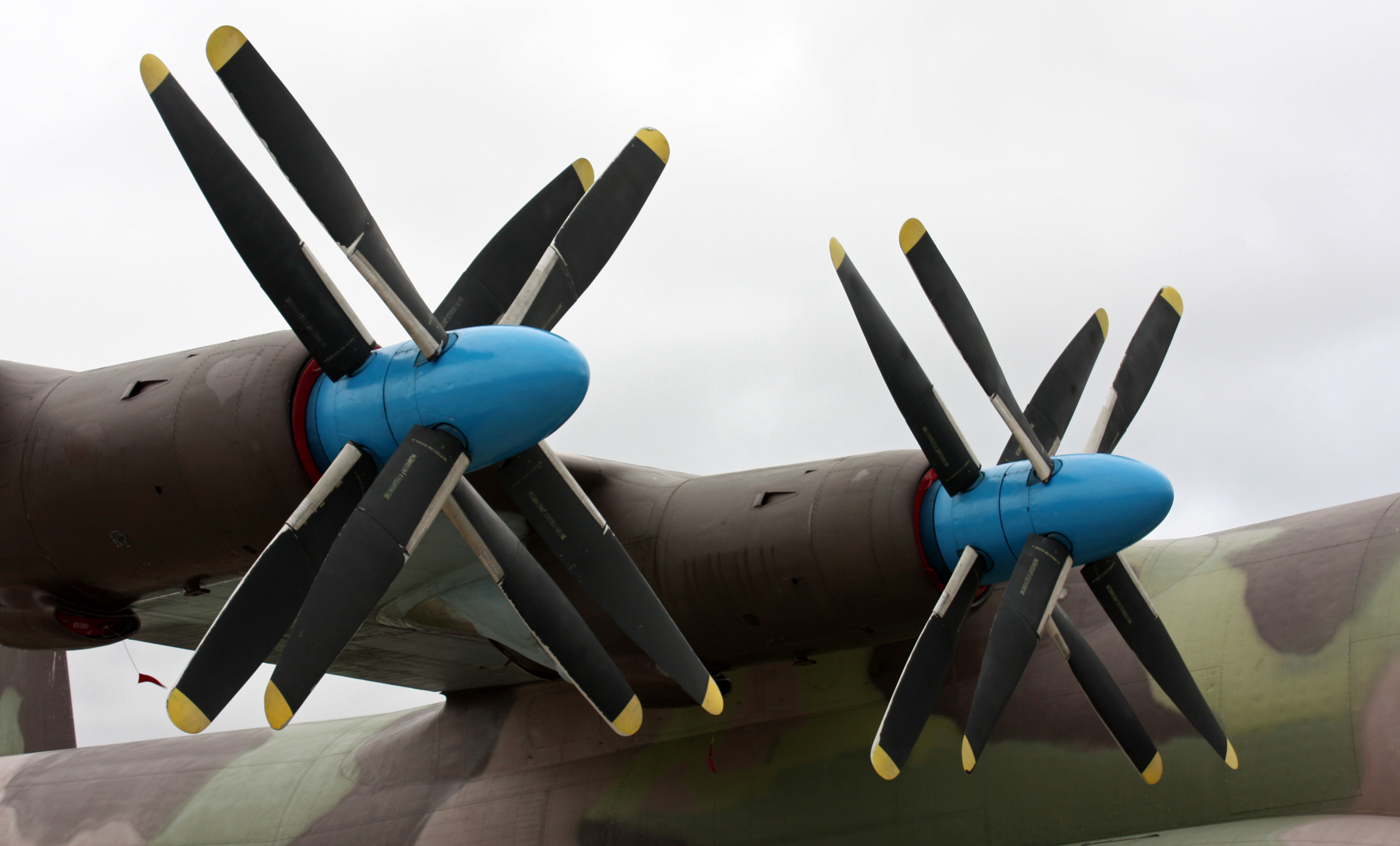
A pair of Kuznetsov NK-12MAs installed on an Antonov An-22

- A-90 Orlyonok
- Antonov An-22
- Tupolev Tu-95
- Tupolev Tu-114
- Tupolev Tu-116
- Tupolev Tu-126
- Tupolev Tu-142

== Specifications (NK-12MV) ==
Data from Aircraft engines of the World 1970, Civil Turboshaft/Turboprop Specifications

==== General characteristics ====
- Type: Turboprop engine
- Length: 6 m (20 ft)
- Diameter: 1,150 mm (45 in)
- Dry weight: 2,900 kg (6,400 lb)

==== Components ====
- Compressor: 14-stage axial flow
- Combustors: 12 combustion chambers
- Turbine: 5-stage axial turbine
- Fuel type: Aviation kerosene such as JP-4 / Soviet spec. T-1 or T-2
- Oil system: Pressure spray at 5.9 bar (85 psi)

==== Performance ====
- Maximum power output: 11,000 kW (15,000 shp) (equivalent) / 11,000 kW (14,750 shp) + 2.78 kN (625 lbf) at 9,250 rpm
- Overall pressure ratio: 13:1 at 9,250 rpm
- Air mass flow: 65 kg/s (140 lb/s) at 9,250 rpm
- Turbine inlet temperature: 1,250 K (980 °C)
- Specific fuel consumption: 0.219 kg/kWh (0.360 lb/(hp⋅h))
- Power-to-weight ratio: 3.7 kW/kg (2.3 hp/lb)

== See also ==
Related lists

- List of aircraft engines
