= Ulyanovsk Aircraft Museum =

Aircraft museum in Ulyanovsk, Russia

Coordinates: 54.290038°N 48.232758°E

Ulyanovsk Aircraft Museum, also known as Muzey Grazhdanskoy Aviatsii or Museum of the History of Civil Aviation, is a public museum that displays Soviet aircraft which are retired from service, and exhibits over 4000 items. It is located next to the Ulyanovsk Baratayevka Airport in Ulyanovsk, Russia. The museum is owned by the Ulyanovsk Institute of Civil Aviation.

== History ==
The creation of the museum was led by the head of the department of educational institutions of the USSR Civil Aviation Administration Darymov Yuri Petrovich and the deputy head of the center of the CA CMEA Vladimir Pavlovich Deldyuzhov.

In 1983, the museum was opened on the territory of the Ulyanovsk Higher Civil Aviation School. In 1989, the museum was awarded the honorary title of "People's Museum". In 1999, the museum became a member of the Association of Technical Museums of the International Union ICOM.

On 14 January 2016, an exposition dedicated to Air Chief Marshal Boris Pavlovich Bugaev was opened in the first hall of the museum in connection with the renaming of the institute, which owned the museum, from "Ulyanovsk Higher Civil Aviation School" to "Ulyanovsk Civil Aviation Institute".

== Exhibitions ==
The museum contains four halls that illustrates the history of aviation from the period of the Russia Civil War to the present, as well as simulators used for training pilots. lt also includes a photo-documentary exposition which reflects the main stages in the development of the history of Civil Aviation in Russia.

The museum exhibits 41 aircraft. All of the aircraft on display were transferred here after being decommissioned, some found by search groups and aviation enthusiasts in Russia.

== List of aircraft on display ==
Aircraft	Registration
Aleksandrov-Kalinin AK-1 (replica)	R-RDAX
Aero L-29 Delfin	125
Antonov An-2	RA-40561
Antonov An-2TP	RA-96235
Antonov An-10	CCCP-11154
Antonov An-14	CCCP-48104
Antonov An-24	CCCP-46761
Antonov An-26	CCCP-26503
Avia Av-14M	CCCP-91588
Ilyushin IL-14M	CCCP-91588
Ilyushin IL-14P	CCCP-06132
Ilyushin IL-18D	CCCP-74250
Ilyushin IL-28	33
Ilyushin IL-62	CCCP-86650
Ilyushin IL-62M	RA-8650
Ilyushin IL-86	CCCP-86062
Let L-410AS Turbolet	CCCP-67252
Mikoyan Gurevich MiG-25P	04
Mil Mi-1M	CCCP-17411
Mil Mi-4PS	CCCP-35277
Mil Mi-6	CCCP-21868
Mil Mi-8T	CCCP-25564
Myasischev M-101T Gzhel	RA-15122
Polikarpov Po-2	CCCP-1988
PZL-Mielec M-15-01 Belphegor	CCCP-15154
Tupolev ANT-4 (TB-1)	CCCP H-317
Tupolev Tu-104	CCCP-42322
Tupolev Tu-114	CCCP-76490
Tupolev Tu-116	CCCP-76462
Tupolev Tu-124Sh	CCCP-45017
Tupolev Tu-134AK	CCCP-65748
Tupolev Tu-144	CCCP-77110
Tupolev Tu-154B	RA-85061
Tupolev Tu-154B-2	RA-85470
Yakolev Yak-12M	CCCP-56360
Yakolev Yak-18T	CCCP-44422
Yakolev Yak-18T	RA-44251
Yakolev Yak-40	RA-87299
Yakolev Yak-40	RA-87357
Yakolev Yak-40	RA-87653
Yakolev Yak-42	RA-42539

== Gallery ==
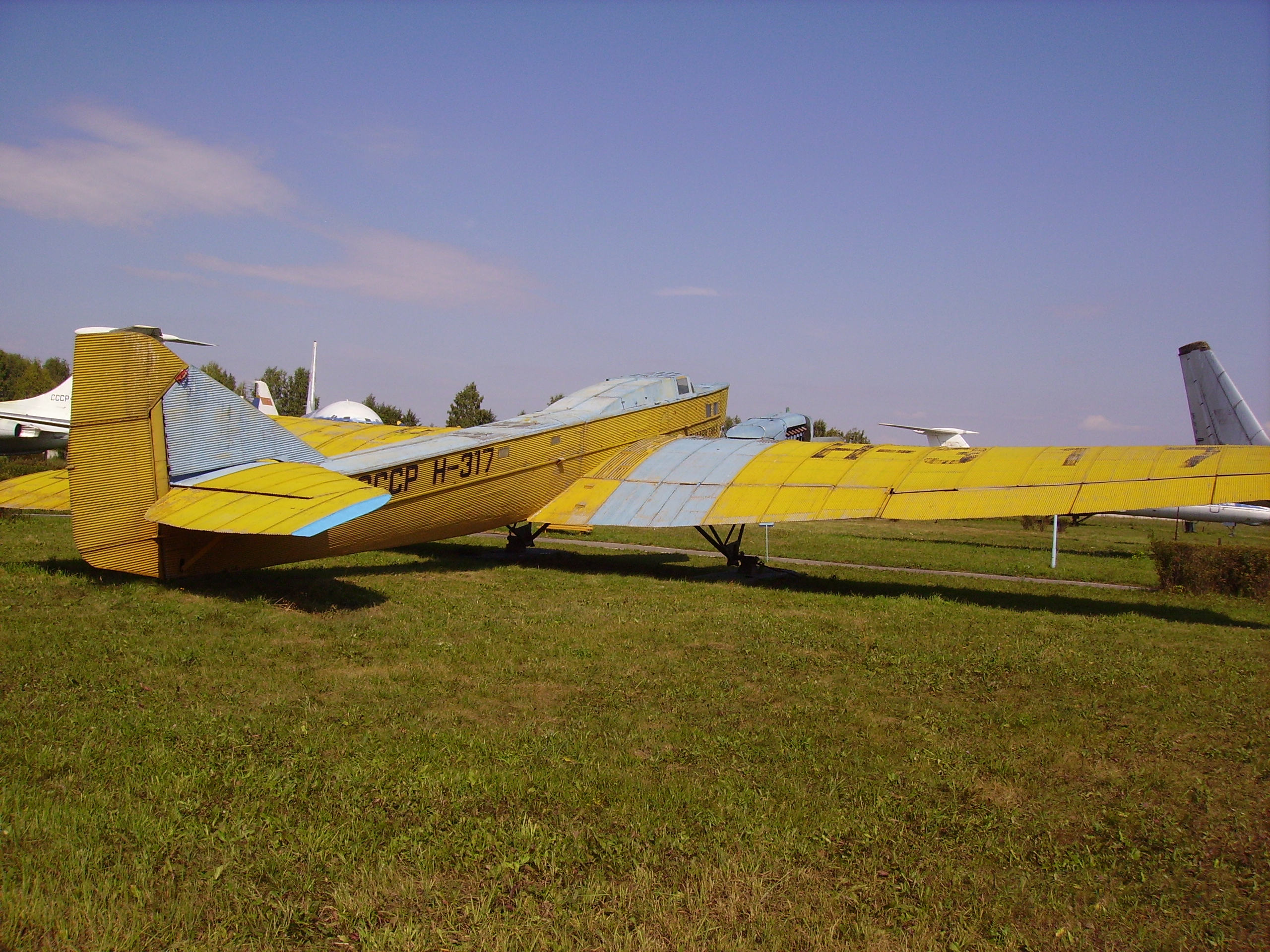
ANT-4

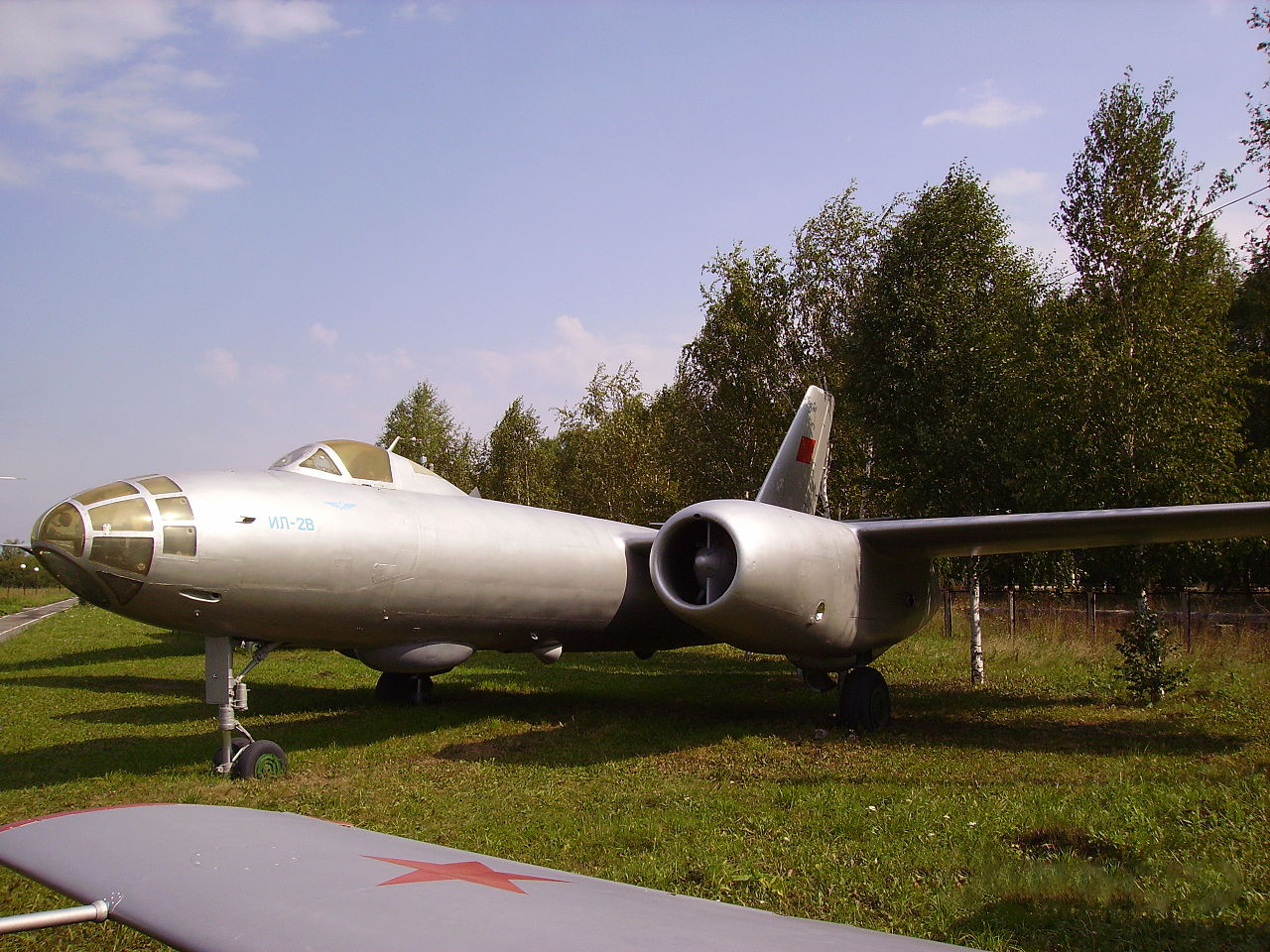
Il-28

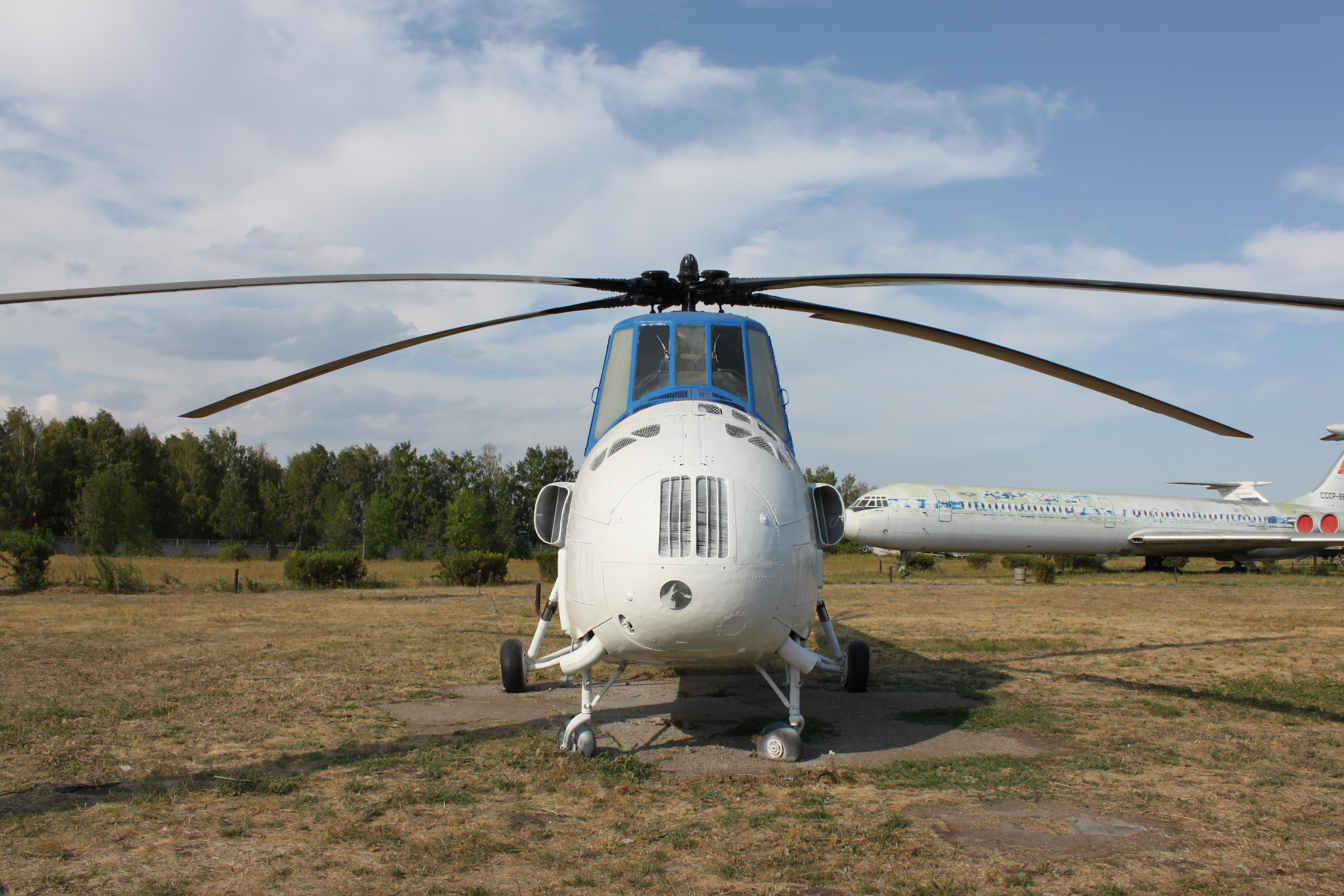
Mi-4

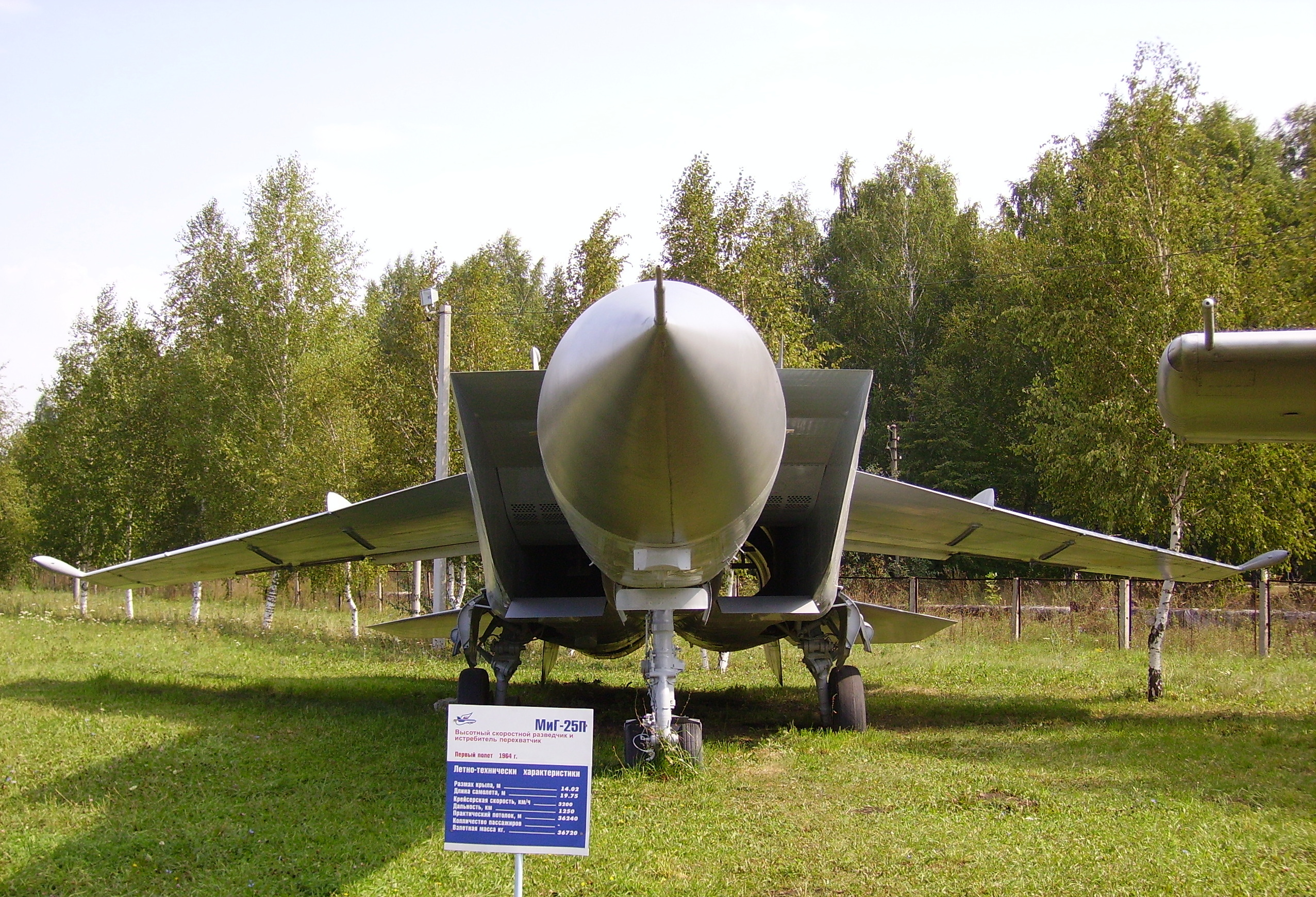
MiG-25P

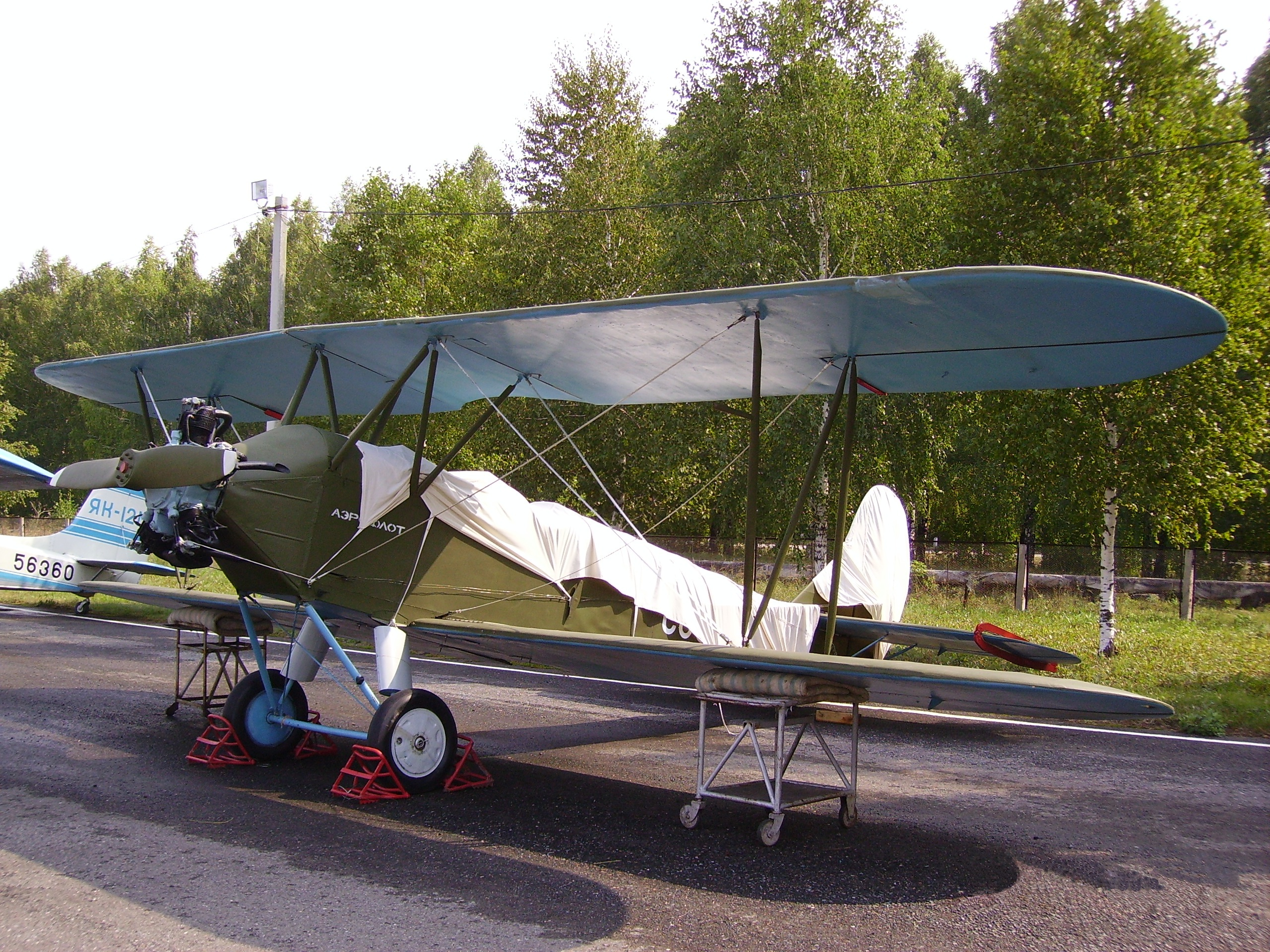
Po-2

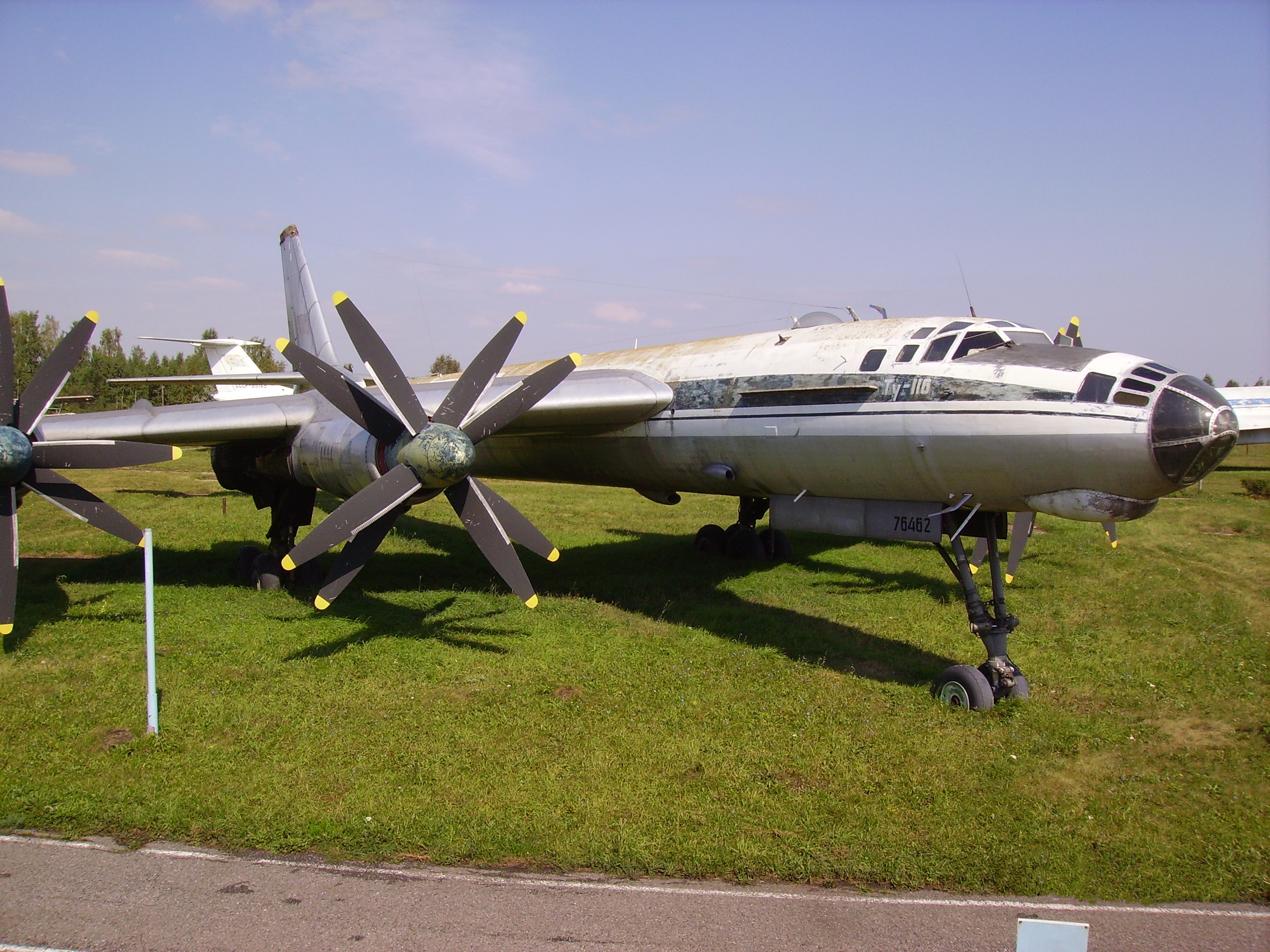
Tu-116

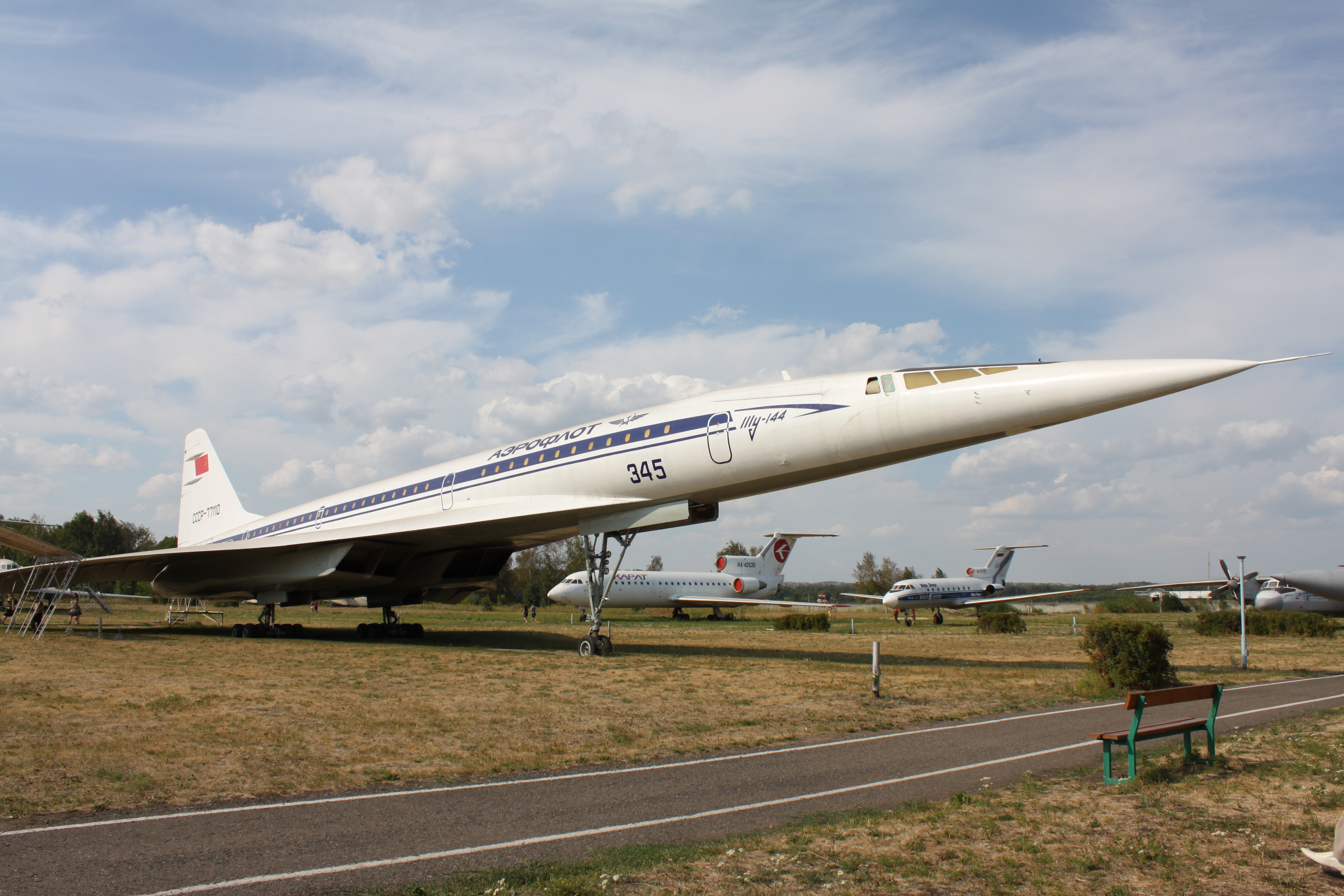
Tu-144

== See also ==
- Central Air Force Museum
- Ryazan Museum of Long-Range Aviation
- Taganrog Aviation Museum
