= Tupolev Tu-116 =

Soviet long-range airliner intended for transporting VVIP & VIP personnels

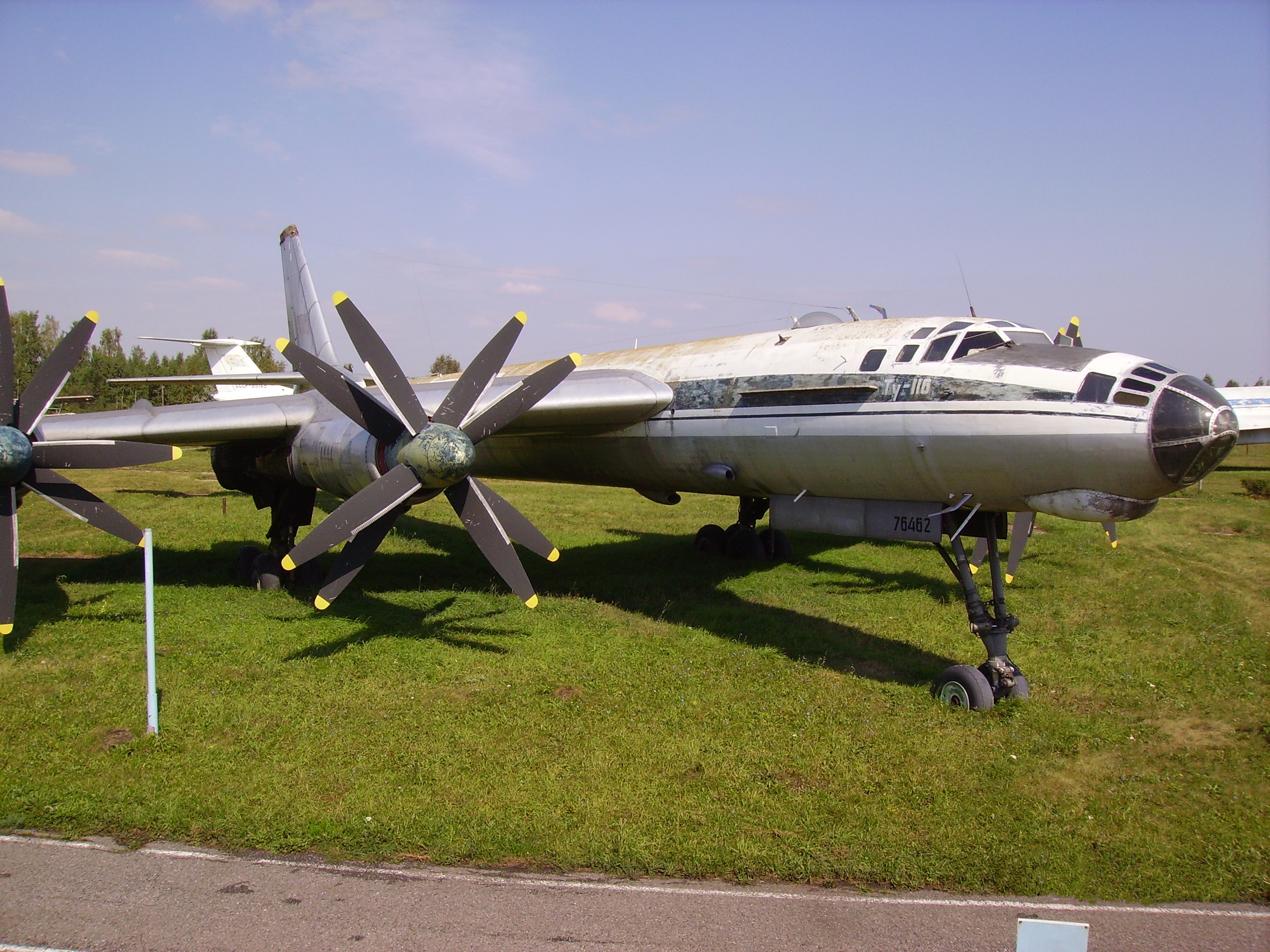
- The only surviving Tu-116 on display at the Ulyanovsk Aircraft Museum

General information
- Type: VIP transport
- Manufacturer: Tupolev
- Primary user: Soviet Air Force
- Number built: 2

History
- First flight: April 23, 1957; 69 years ago
- Developed from: Tupolev Tu-95

The Tupolev Tu-116 (Russian: Туполев Ту-116) is a turboprop-powered long-range airliner designed by the Tupolev design bureau and built in the USSR.

== Development ==
The Tu-116, like the Tu-114, was based on the Tu-95 strategic bomber. Both airliners were developed in parallel with the Tu-116 taking priority due to the numerous visits of General Secretary Nikita Khrushchev to both Western and Eastern countries during the so-called Khrushchev Thaw. The aircraft's mission was to transport the head of state together with his security detail and entourage. Concurrent development of the Tu-114 and Tu-116 was justified by Khrushchev's visit to the United States, at which time the Tu-114 might not have been ready.

Initially, the airliner was to be developed very quickly, in a little over a year, due to the relative simplicity of modifications. However, the initial introduction date was moved from September 1956 to 1957 because the Tupolev Design Bureau was overloaded with military orders.

The airliner received the internal code Tu-114D ("Diplomatic"), which later created some confusion – the Tu-114D was also the official designation of the long-range variant for transatlantic flights, the letter D standing for "dalniy" (Russian for "long-range"), which also had a total of 64 passenger seats.

== Design ==
The airliner was to transport 24 passengers including a cook, a flight attendant, a navigator-announcer to inform the passengers about the flight, and, when necessary, 10–12 armed guards.

Technically, the airliner was not much different from the original Tu-95. All protective and bombing equipment was removed, and the space behind the wings was given to two passenger cabins, a lavatory, a wardrobe, and a service room with a total area of 70 square meters (750 sq ft), with windows cut into the fuselage. The first passenger cabin held six–eight passengers and the second one was designed for three VIP passengers, equipped with beds and couches.

The pressurized cabin led to a short hallway with a staircase which was lowered to allow access from the ground. It also served as an emergency exit.

The flight crew consisted of two pilots, navigator, flight engineer, flight mechanic and radio operator.

== Operational history ==
The two Tu-116s were modified from two regular Tu-95s, MSN 402 and 409. Neither was ever used to transport the head of state.

After flight testing, both airliners were transferred to the Soviet Air Force and served for various purposes until the early 1990s. A Tu-116 is on display at the Ulyanovsk Aircraft Museum, located at the Ulyanovsk Baratayevka Airport

== Specifications (Tu-116) ==
Data from

General characteristics

- Crew: 7–8
- Capacity: 24 passengers (60 pax. max) / 32,000 kg (70,548 lb)
- Length: 46.17 m (151 ft 6 in)
- Wingspan: 54.1 m (177 ft 6 in)
- Height: 15.5 m (50 ft 10 in)
- Wing area: 311.1 m^{2} (3,349 sq ft)
- Airfoil: TsAGI SR-5S
- Empty weight: 93,500 kg (206,132 lb)
- Gross weight: 124,000 kg (273,373 lb)
- Max takeoff weight: 182,000 kg (401,241 lb)
- Powerplant: 4 × Kuznetsov NK-12MV turboprop engines, 11,000 kW (15,000 shp) each
- Propellers: 8-bladed contra-rotating propellers

Performance

- Maximum speed: 900 km/h (560 mph, 490 kn)
- Cruise speed: 800 km/h (500 mph, 430 kn)
- Range: 10,750 km (6,680 mi, 5,800 nmi)
- Service ceiling: 12,000 m (39,000 ft)
- Wing loading: 421 kg/m^{2} (86 lb/sq ft)
- Power/mass: 0.168 kW/kg (0.102 hp/lb)
