= Aeroflot Flight 065 =

1966 aviation accident

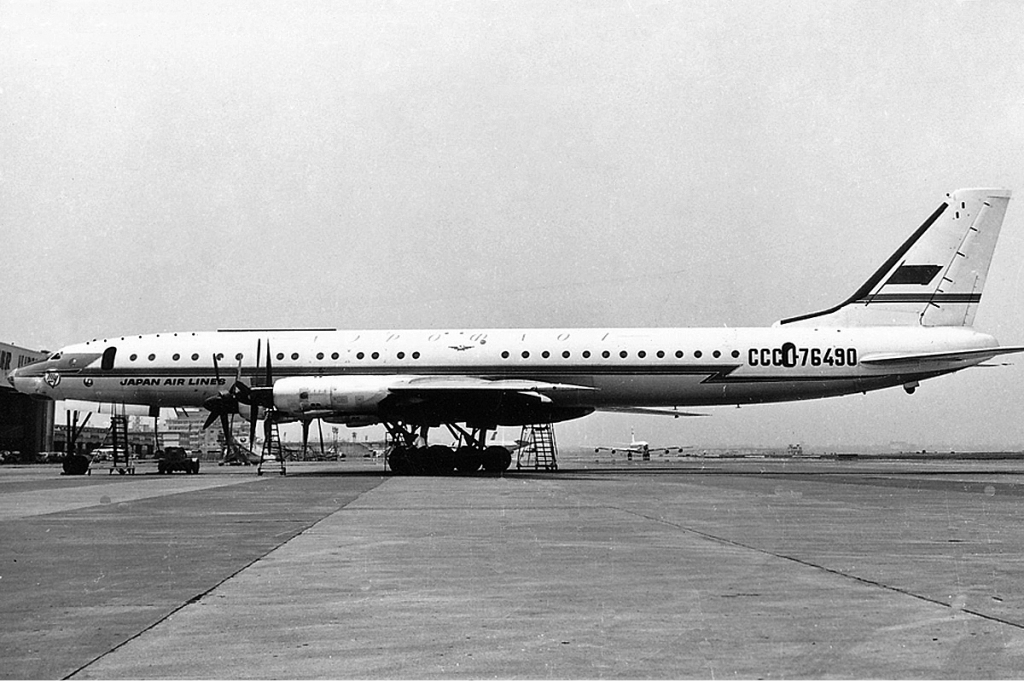
- An Aeroflot Tupolev Tu-114, similar to the aircraft involved

Accident
- Date: 17 February 1966
- Summary: Crew and ATC errors
- Site: Sheremetyevo International Airport; 55.9699°N 37.3879°E

Aircraft
- Aircraft type: Tupolev Tu-114
- Operator: Aeroflot/International
- Registration: CCCP-76491
- Flight origin: Sheremetyevo International Airport, Moscow, Russian SSR
- 1st stopover: Conakry International Airport, Conakry, Republic of Guinea
- Last stopover: Accra International Airport, Accra, Ghana
- Destination: Maya-Maya Airport, Brazzaville, Republic of the Congo
- Occupants: 66
- Passengers: 47
- Crew: 19
- Fatalities: 21
- Survivors: 45

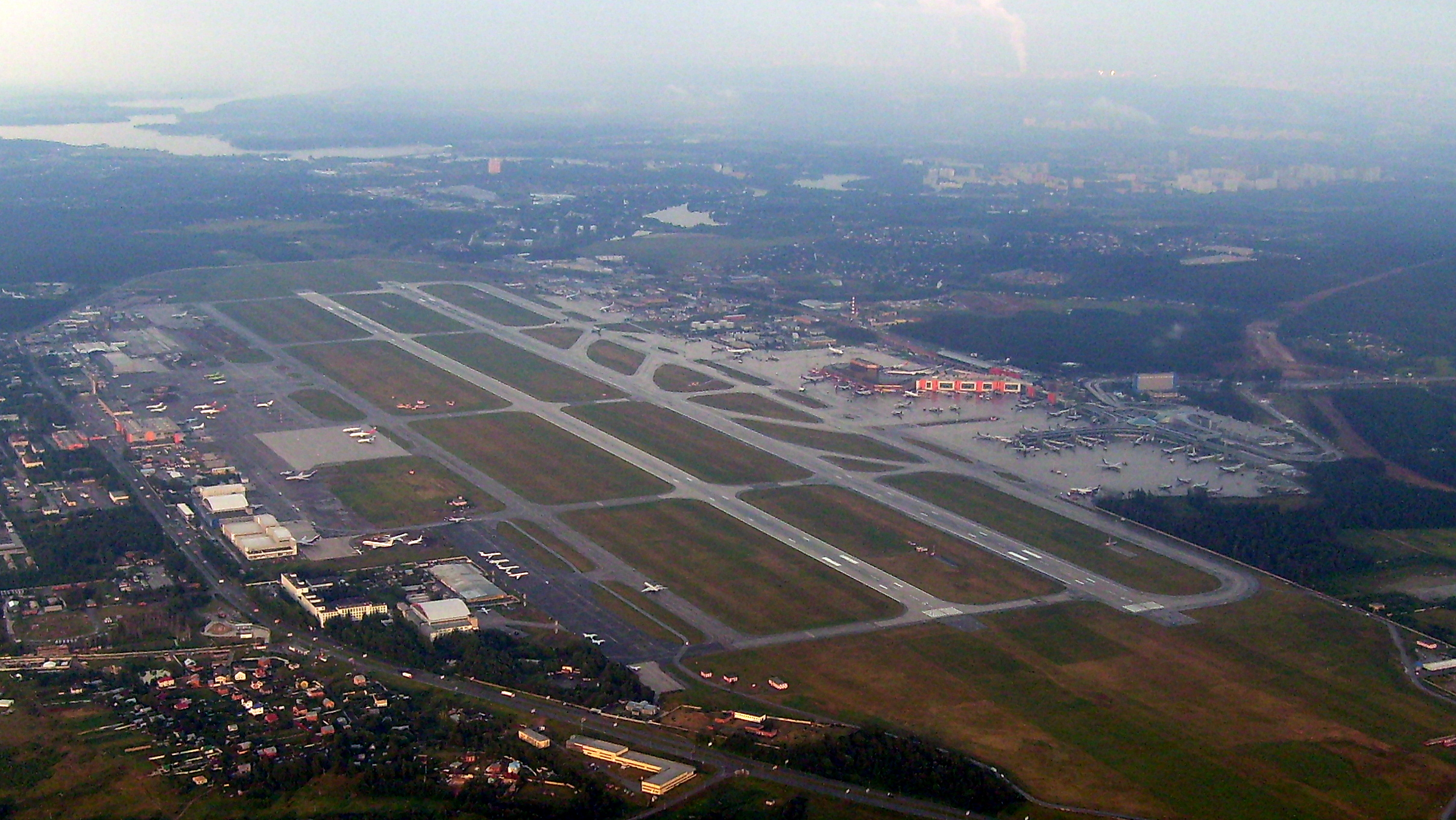
Sheremetyevo International Airport in July 2011

Aeroflot Flight 065 was a scheduled passenger flight operated by Aeroflot. On 17 February 1966, the Tupolev Tu-114 operated by the airline crashed during take-off from Sheremetyevo International Airport in Moscow, killing 21 of the 47 passengers and 19 crew members on board.

This was the only fatal crash involving the Tu-114.

== Aircraft ==
The Tu-114 involved, registration CCCP-74691 (c/n 64M472, s/n 47-02) was manufactured at the Kuibyshev Aircraft Plant on 16 December 1964 and on 18 November 1965 was transferred to the Main Directorate of the Civil Air Fleet, who assigned it to the Sheremetyevo Flight Detachment of the Transport Directorate of International Air Lines of Civil Aviation (TU MVL GA, later named TsU MVS). At the time of the crash, the aircraft had only 93 flight hours and 19 landings.

== See also ==
- Aeroflot accidents and incidents
- Aeroflot accidents and incidents in the 1960s
